= A Beautiful Mind =

2001 film by Ron Howard

- Theatrical release poster
- Directed by: Ron Howard
- Screenplay by: Akiva Goldsman
- Based on: A Beautiful Mind by Sylvia Nasar
- Produced by: Brian Grazer; Ron Howard (Note: Howard was an uncredited producer in the film's release poster and home media. However, he received a"Produced by" credit alongside Grazer onscreen in the film's ending credits.)
- Starring: Russell Crowe; Ed Harris; Jennifer Connelly; Paul Bettany; Adam Goldberg; Judd Hirsch; Josh Lucas; Anthony Rapp; Christopher Plummer
- Cinematography: Roger Deakins
- Edited by: Daniel P. Hanley; Mike Hill
- Music by: James Horner
- Production company: Imagine Entertainment
- Distributed by: Universal Pictures (North America); DreamWorks Pictures (through United International Pictures; international)
- Release dates: December 13, 2001 (Beverly Hills premiere); December 21, 2001 (United States)
- Running time: 135 minutes
- Country: United States
- Language: English
- Budget: $58 million
- Box office: $316.8 million

A Beautiful Mind is a 2001 American biographical drama film about the mathematician John Nash who won a Nobel Memorial Prize in Economic Sciences. Nash's character was played by actor Russell Crowe. The film was directed by Ron Howard and based on a screenplay by Akiva Goldsman, who adapted the 1998 biography by Sylvia Nasar. In addition to Crowe, the film's cast features Ed Harris, Jennifer Connelly, Paul Bettany, Adam Goldberg, Judd Hirsch, Josh Lucas, Anthony Rapp, and Christopher Plummer in supporting roles. The story follows Nash's life and career as he struggles with the impact schizophrenia had on him.

A Beautiful Mind premiered in Beverly Hills on December 13, 2001 before being released theatrically in the United States on December 21, 2001, by Universal Pictures and internationally by DreamWorks Pictures (through United International Pictures). It received generally positive reviews and went on to gross $316.8 million worldwide against a $58 million budget, and won four Academy Awards, for Best Picture, Best Director, Best Adapted Screenplay and Best Supporting Actress (Connelly). It was also nominated for Best Actor (Crowe), Best Film Editing, Best Makeup, and Best Original Score.

== Plot ==
In 1947, John Nash arrives at Princeton University as a co-recipient, with Martin Hansen, of the Carnegie Scholarship for Mathematics. He meets fellow math and science graduate students Sol, Ainsley, and Bender, and his roommate Charles Herman, a literature student.

Determined to publish an original idea of his own, Nash is inspired when he and his classmates discuss how to approach a group of women at a bar. Nash argues that a cooperative approach would lead to better chances of success, which leads him to develop a new concept of governing dynamics. His theory earns him an appointment at MIT where he chooses Sol and Bender over Hansen to join him.

In 1953, Nash is invited to the Pentagon to decipher encrypted enemy telecommunications. Bored with his work at MIT, he is recruited by the mysterious William Parcher of the United States Department of Defense with a classified assignment: to identify hidden patterns in magazines and newspapers to thwart a Soviet plot. He is given an implanted diode that gives him a passcode to access a drop spot at a mansion. Nash becomes increasingly obsessive with his work and grows paranoid.

Nash falls in love with a student, Alicia Larde, and they eventually marry. After a shootout between Parcher and Soviet agents, Nash tries to quit his assignment but is forced to continue. While delivering a guest lecture at Harvard University, Nash believes Soviet agents are pursuing him and is forcibly sedated. He awakens to a psychiatric facility under the care of Dr. Rosen.

Dr. Rosen tells Alicia that Nash has schizophrenia and that Charles, Marcee (niece of Charles), and Parcher exist only in his imagination. Alicia, Sol and Bender investigate her husband's study, which shows various news and magazine clippings. Alicia uncovers the stack of unopened "classified documents" from the drop point and brings them to Nash, revealing the truth of his assignment. Overcome with shock, Nash slices his arm open to uncover the diode, which doesn't exist. Nash is given a course of insulin shock therapy and eventually released. Frustrated with the side effects of his antipsychotic medication, in particular erectile dysfunction, he secretly stops taking it. He encounters Parcher, who urges him to continue his assignment in a shed near his home.

In 1956, Alicia discovers Nash has relapsed and rushes home. She finds that Nash had left their infant son in the running bathtub, convinced "Charles" was watching the baby. Alicia calls Dr. Rosen, but Nash accidentally hits her and the baby, believing he's saving them from Parcher. As Alicia flees with the baby, Nash realizes that all of them have looked the same ever since he first encountered them, in particular that "Marcee" has always remained a young girl, and concludes they must be hallucinations. Against Dr. Rosen's advice, Nash chooses not to be hospitalized again, believing he can deal with his symptoms himself with Alicia's support.

Nash returns to Princeton, approaching his old rival Hansen, now head of the mathematics department, who allows him to work out of the library and audit classes. Over the next two decades, Nash learns to ignore his hallucinations and, by the late 1970s, is allowed to teach again. In 1994, Nash is awarded the Nobel Memorial Prize in Economic Sciences for his work on game theory and is honored by his fellow professors. At the Stockholm ceremony, he dedicates the prize to his wife. Nash reencounters Charles, Marcee, and Parcher after the ceremony, but ignores them as he, Alicia, and their son leave.

== Cast ==
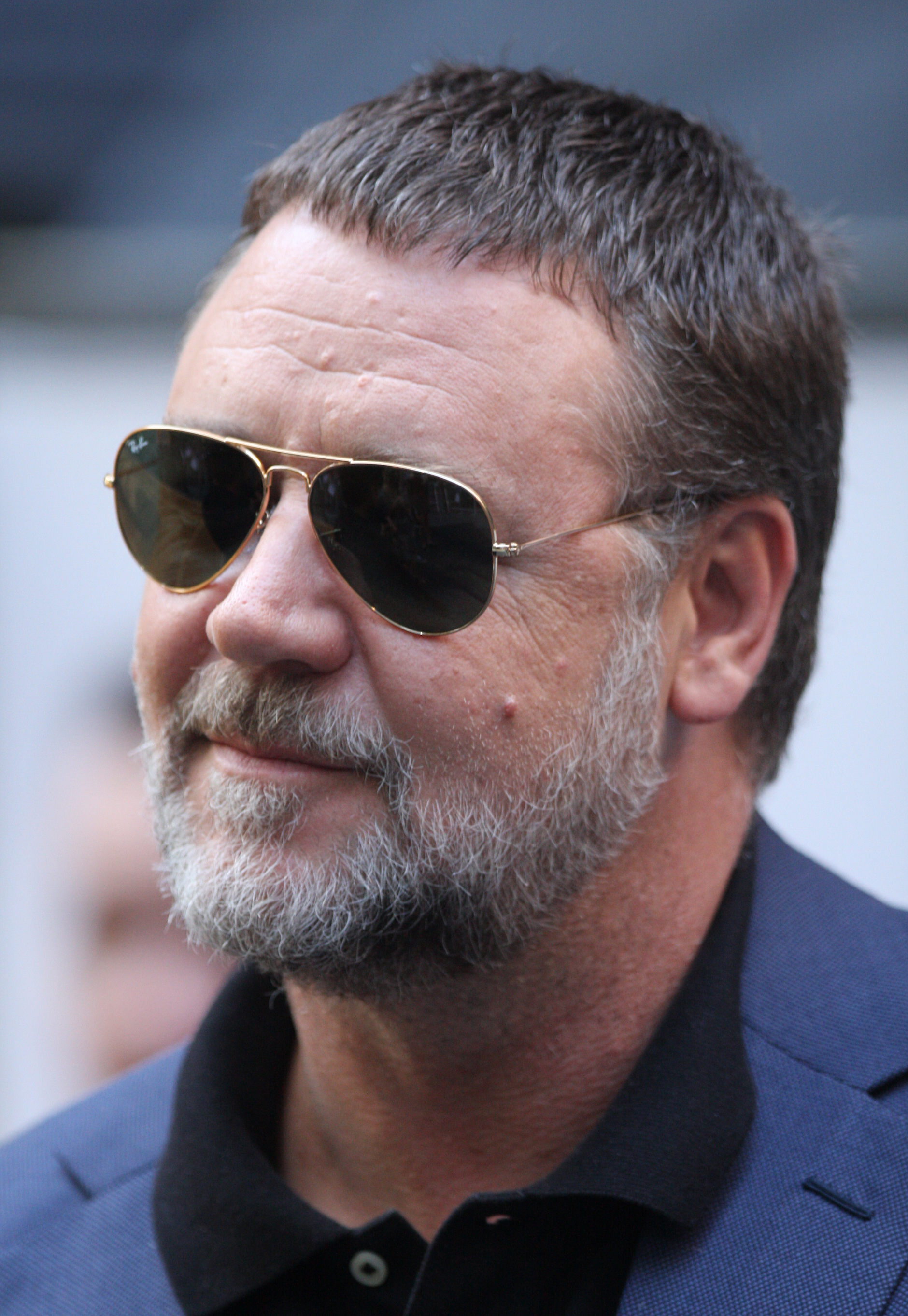
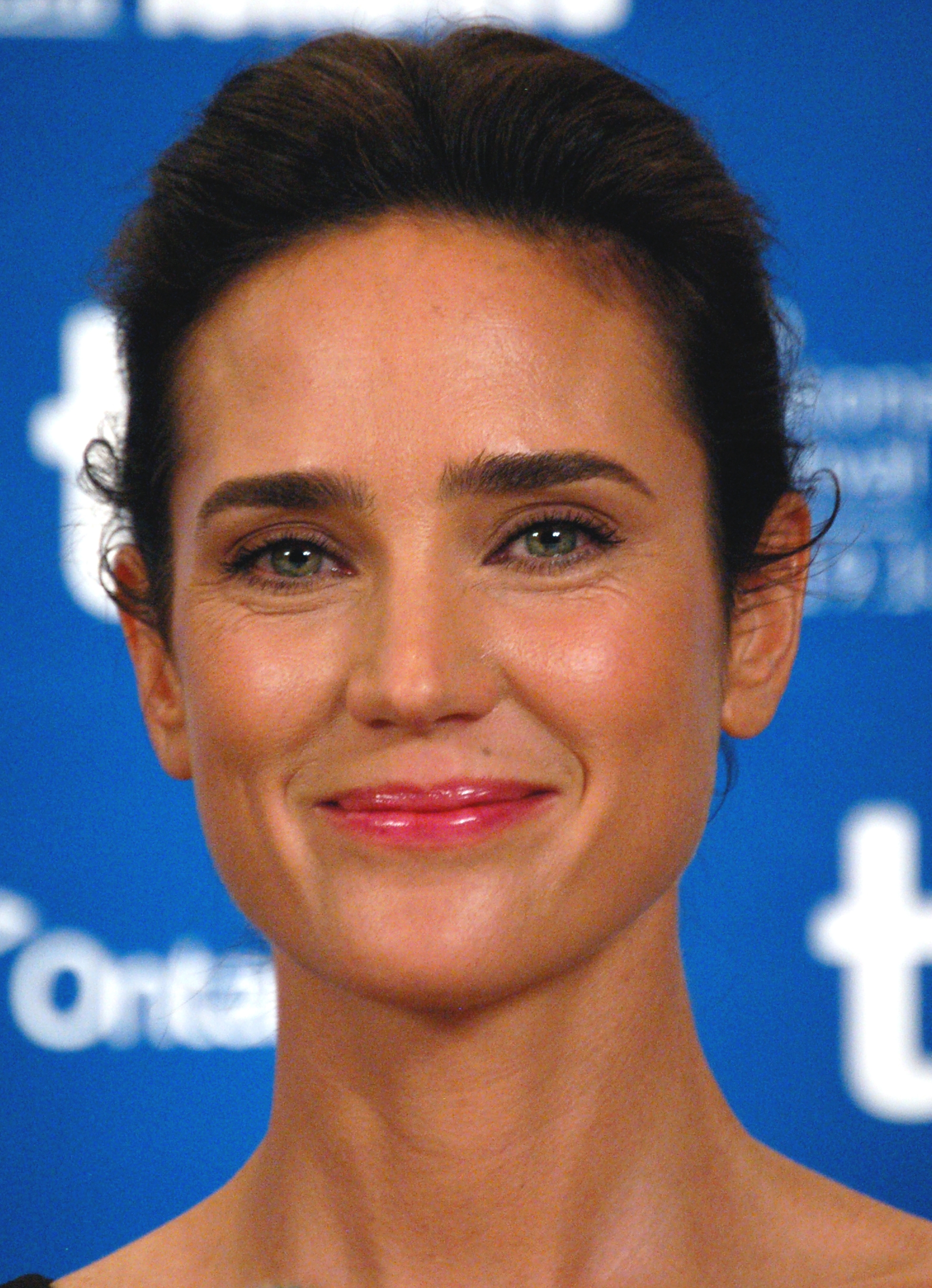
Russell Crowe (left) and Jennifer Connelly (right), play John and Alicia Nash, respectively.
- Russell Crowe as John Nash
- Jennifer Connelly as Alicia Nash
- Ed Harris as William Parcher
- Christopher Plummer as Dr. Rosen
- Paul Bettany as Charles Herman
- Adam Goldberg as Richard Sol
- Josh Lucas as Martin Hansen
- Anthony Rapp as Bender
- Jason Gray-Stanford as Ainsley Neilson
- Judd Hirsch as Hellinger
- Austin Pendleton as Thomas King
- Vivien Cardone as Marcee Herman
- Killian, Christian, and Daniel Coffinet-Crean as Baby

== Production ==
=== Development ===
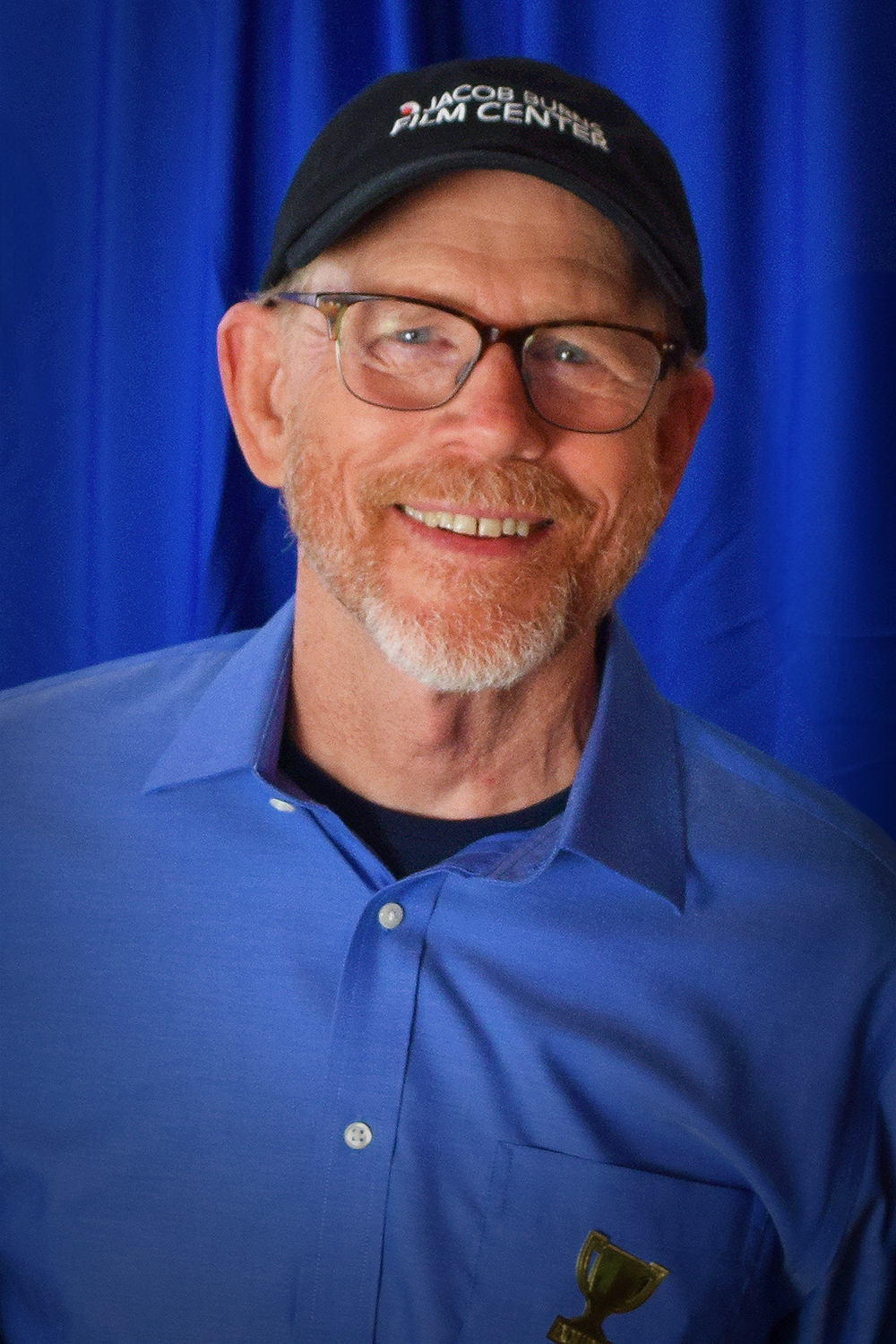
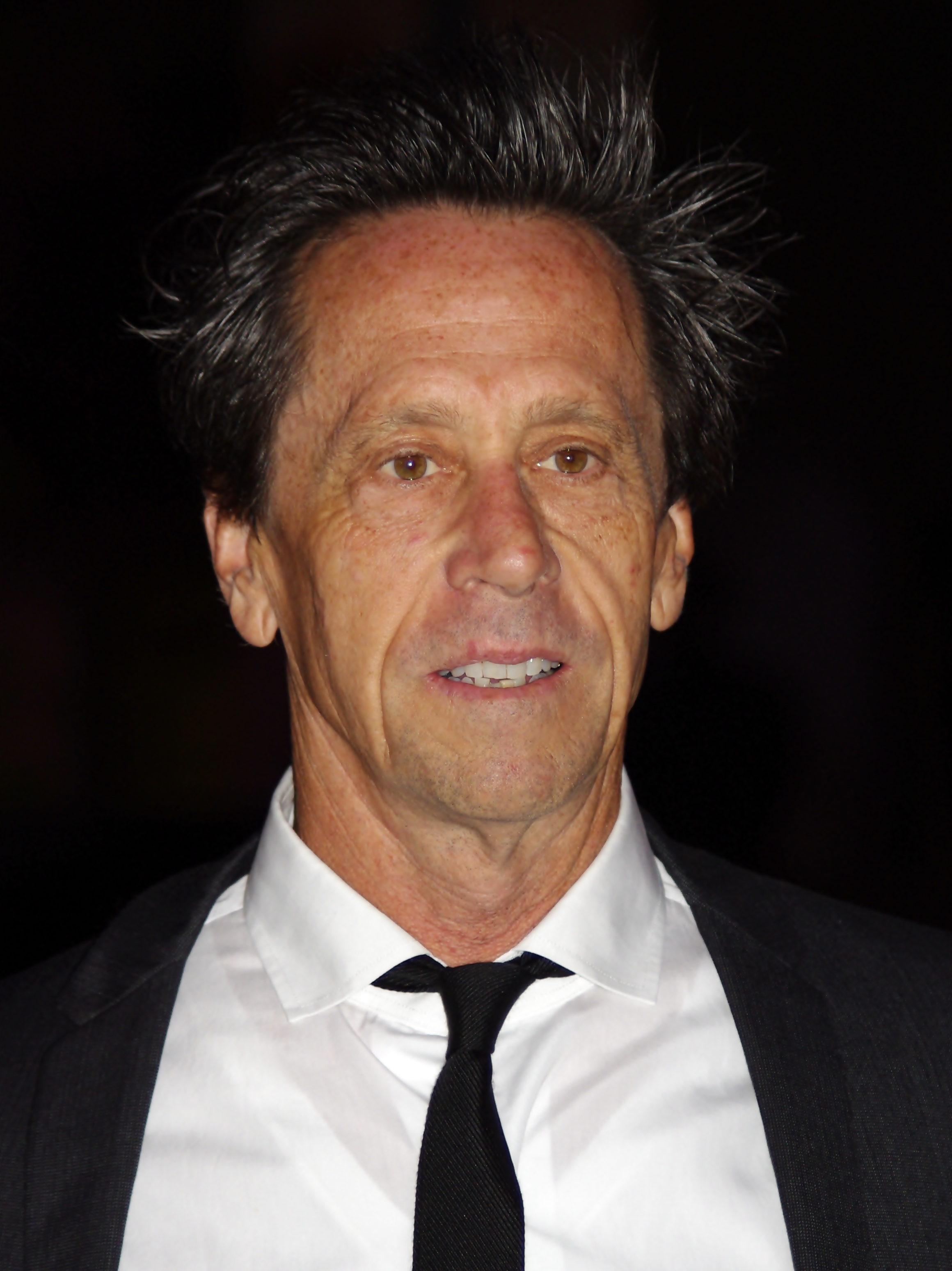
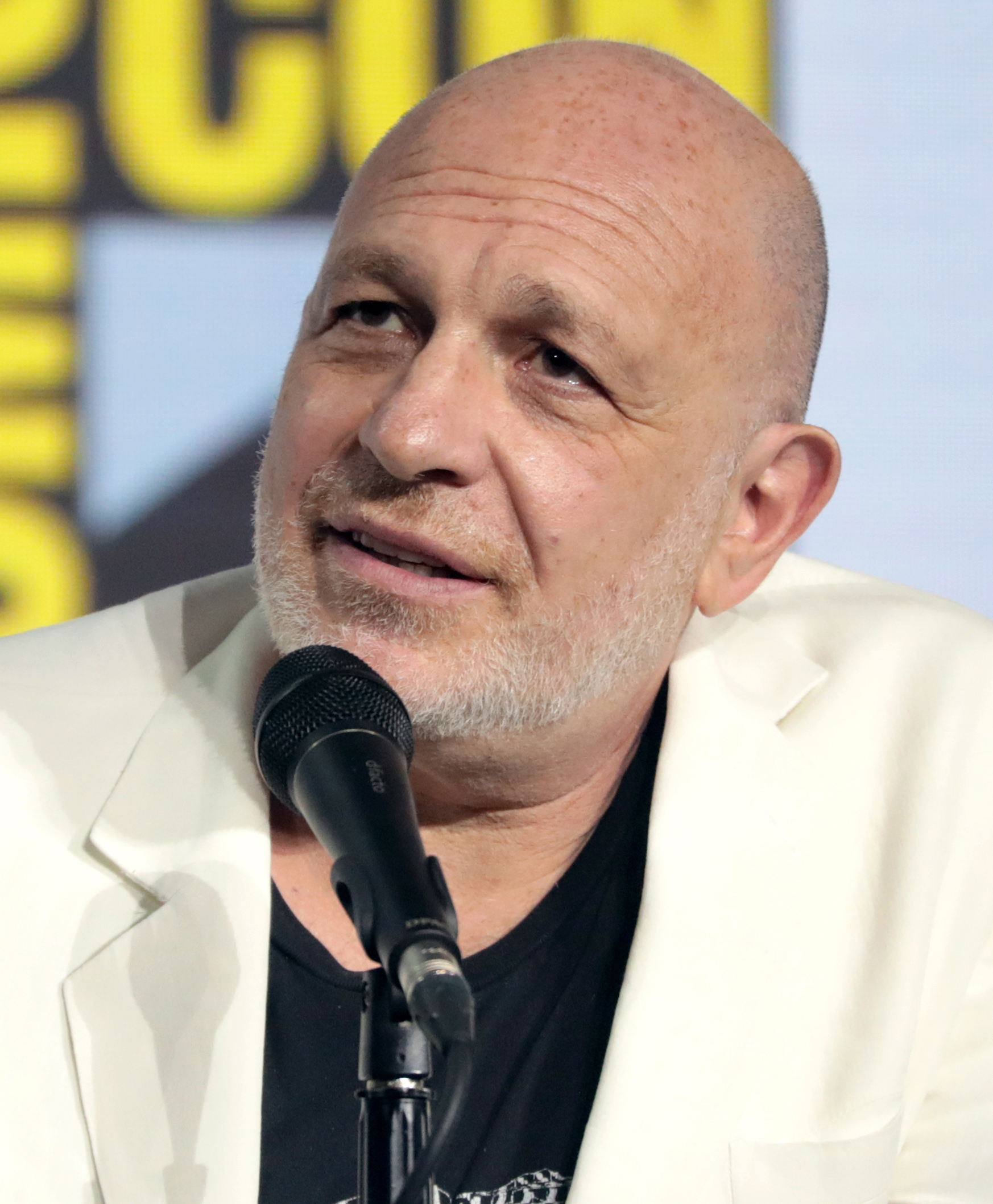
From L-R: Director/co-producer Ron Howard, co-producer Brian Grazer and screenwriter Akiva Goldsman

A Beautiful Mind was the second schizophrenia-themed film that Ron Howard had planned to direct. The first, Laws of Madness, would have been based on the true story of schizophrenic Michael Laudor, who overcame difficult odds to graduate from Yale Law School. Howard purchased the rights to Laudor's life story for $1.5 million in 1995 and had Brad Pitt slated to play the lead role. However, after Laudor killed his fiancée in 1998 during a psychotic episode, plans for the movie were cancelled.

After producer Brian Grazer first read an excerpt of Sylvia Nasar's 1998 book A Beautiful Mind in Vanity Fair magazine, he immediately purchased the rights to the film. Grazer later said that many A-list directors were calling with their point of view on the project. He eventually brought the project to Ron Howard, his long-time professional partner.

Grazer met with many screenwriters, mostly consisting of "serious dramatists", but he chose Akiva Goldsman because of his strong passion and desire for the project. Goldsman's creative take on the project was to avoid having viewers understand they are viewing an alternative reality until a specific point in the film. This was done to rob the viewers of their understanding and to mimic how Nash comprehended his experiences. Howard agreed to direct the film based on the first draft. He asked Goldsman to emphasize the love story of Nash and his wife; she was critical to his ability to continue living at home.

Dave Bayer, a professor of mathematics at Barnard College, Columbia University, was consulted on the mathematical equations that appear in the film. For the scene where Nash has to teach a calculus class and gives them a complicated problem to keep them busy, Bayer chose a problem physically unrealistic but mathematically very rich, in keeping with Nash as "someone who really doesn't want to teach the mundane details, who will home in on what's really interesting". Bayer received a cameo role as a professor who lays his pen down for Nash in the pen ceremony near the film's end.

Greg Cannom was chosen to create the makeup effects for A Beautiful Mind, specifically the age progression of the characters. Crowe had previously worked with Cannom on The Insider. Howard had also worked with Cannom on Cocoon. Each character's stages of makeup were broken down by the number of years that would pass between levels. Cannom stressed subtlety between the stages, but worked toward the ultimate "Older Nash" stage. The production team originally decided that the makeup department would age Russell Crowe throughout the film; however, at Crowe's request, the makeup was used to push his look to resemble the facial features of John Nash. Cannom developed a new silicone-type makeup that could simulate skin and be used for overlapping applications; this shortened make-up application time from eight to four hours. Crowe was also fitted with several dentures to give him a slight overbite in the film.

Howard and Grazer chose frequent collaborator James Horner to score the film because they knew of his communication ability. Howard said, regarding Horner, "it's like having a conversation with a writer or an actor or another director". A running discussion between the director and the composer was about high-level mathematics being less about numbers and solutions and more akin to a kaleidoscope, in that the ideas evolve and change. After the film's first screening, Horner told Howard: "I see changes occurring like fast-moving weather systems". He chose it as another theme to connect to Nash's ever-changing character. Horner chose Welsh singer Charlotte Church to sing the soprano vocals after deciding that he needed a balance between a child and adult singing voice. He wanted a "purity, clarity and brightness of an instrument" but also a vibrato to maintain the humanity of the voice.

The film was shot 90% chronologically. Three separate trips were made to the Princeton University campus. During filming, Howard decided that Nash's hallucinations should always be introduced first audibly and then visually. This provides a clue for the audience and establishes the hallucinations from Nash's point of view. The historic John Nash had only auditory hallucinations. The filmmakers developed a technique to represent Nash's mental epiphanies. Mathematicians described to them such moments as a sense of "the smoke clearing", "flashes of light" and "everything coming together", so the filmmakers used a flash of light appearing over an object or person to signify Nash's creativity at work. Two night shots were done at Fairleigh Dickinson University's campus in Florham Park, New Jersey, in the Vanderbilt Mansion ballroom. Portions of the film set at Harvard were filmed at Manhattan University. (Harvard has turned down most requests for on-location filming ever since the filming of Love Story (1970), which caused significant physical damage to trees on campus.)

Tom Cruise was considered for the lead role. Howard ultimately cast Russell Crowe. For the role of Alicia Nash, Rachel Weisz was offered the role but turned it down. Charlize Theron and Julia Ormond auditioned for the role. According to Ron Howard, the four finalists for the role of Alicia were Ashley Judd, Claire Forlani, Mary McCormack and Jennifer Connelly, with Connelly winning the role. Before the casting of Connelly, Hilary Swank and Salma Hayek were also candidates for the part.

=== Writing ===
The film's narrative differs considerably from the events of Nash's life in many respects, as filmmakers used artistic license to create a compelling film. Most prominently, few of the characters in the film, besides John and Alicia Nash, correspond directly to actual people. A Beautiful Mind has been criticized for neglecting factual events, but the filmmakers said they never intended a literal representation of his life. The PBS documentary A Brilliant Madness tried to portray his life more accurately.

One difficulty was finding a method to visually depict Nash's mental illness. In reality, Nash never had visual hallucinations: Charles Herman (the "roommate"), Marcee Herman and William Parcher (the Defense agent) are a scriptwriter's invention. Sylvia Nasar said that the filmmakers "invented a narrative that, while far from a literal telling, is true to the spirit of Nash's story". Nash spent his years between Princeton and MIT as a consultant for the RAND Corporation in California, but in the film he is portrayed as having worked for the Department of Defense at the Pentagon instead. His handlers, both from faculty and administration, had to introduce him to assistants and strangers.

The Nash equilibrium discussion was criticized as over-simplified. In the film, Nash has schizophrenic hallucinations while he is in graduate school, but in his life he did not have this experience until some years later. No mention is made of Nash's alleged homosexual experiences at RAND. Nash's biographer notes he was arrested in a 1954 police sting operation targeting gay men in Santa Monica and subsequently lost his security clearance, but charges were dropped and there is no evidence Nash was ever sexually active with men. Furthermore, both Nash and his wife denied these encounters occurred. Nash fathered a son, John David Stier (born June 19, 1953), by Eleanor Agnes Stier (1921–2005), a nurse whom he abandoned when she told him of her pregnancy. The film did not include Alicia's divorce of John in 1963. It was not until after Nash won the Nobel Memorial Prize in 1994 that they renewed their relationship. In 1970, Alicia allowed him to live with her as a boarder. They remarried in 2001.

Nash is shown to join Wheeler Laboratory at MIT, but no such lab exists. Instead, he was appointed as C. L. E. Moore instructor at MIT, and later as a professor. The film furthermore does not touch on the revolutionary work of John Nash in differential geometry and partial differential equations, such as the Nash embedding theorem or his proof of Hilbert's nineteenth problem, work which he did in his time at MIT and for which he was given the Abel Prize in 2015. The so-called pen ceremony tradition at Princeton shown in the film is fictitious. The film has Nash saying in 1994: "I take the newer medications". He did not take any medication from 1970 onward, something highlighted in Nasar's biography. Howard later stated that they added the line of dialogue because they worried that the film would be criticized for suggesting that all people with schizophrenia can overcome their illness without medication. In addition, Nash never gave an acceptance speech for his Nobel prize.

== Release ==
A Beautiful Mind received a limited release on December 13, 2001, and received positive reviews. Crowe received wide acclaim for his performance. It was later released in the United States on December 21, 2001.

A Beautiful Mind was released on VHS and DVD, in wide- and full-screen editions, in North America on June 25, 2002. The DVD set includes audio commentaries, deleted scenes, and documentaries. The film was also released on Blu-ray in North America on January 25, 2011.

== Reception ==
=== Box office ===
During the five-day weekend of the limited release, A Beautiful Mind opened at the #12 spot at the box office, peaking at the #2 spot following the wide release. The film went on to gross $170,742,341 in the United States and Canada and $313,542,341 worldwide.

=== Critical response ===
On Rotten Tomatoes, A Beautiful Mind holds an approval rating of 74% based on 214 reviews and an average score of 7.20/10. The website's critical consensus states: "The well-acted A Beautiful Mind is both a moving love story and a revealing look at mental illness." On Metacritic, the film has a weighted average score of 72 out of 100 based on 33 reviews, indicating "generally favorable" reviews. Audiences polled by CinemaScore gave the film an average grade of "A−" on an A+ to F scale.

Roger Ebert of Chicago Sun-Times gave the film four out of four stars. Mike Clark of USA Today gave three-and-a-half out of four stars and also praised Crowe's performance, calling it a welcome follow-up to Howard's previous film, 2000's How the Grinch Stole Christmas. Desson Thomson of The Washington Post found the film to be "one of those formulaically rendered Important Subject movies". The portrayal of mathematics in the film was praised by the mathematics community, including John Nash himself.

John Sutherland of The Guardian noted the film's biopic distortions, but said that "Howard pulls off an extraordinary trick in A Beautiful Mind by seducing the audience into Nash's paranoid world. We may not leave the cinema with A-level competence in game theory, but we do get a glimpse into what it feels like to be mad - and not know it."

Writing in the Los Angeles Times, Lisa Navarrette criticized the casting of Jennifer Connelly as Alicia Nash as an example of whitewashing. Alicia Nash was born in El Salvador and had an accent not portrayed in the film.

Shailee Koranne of CBC Arts argued that the film presents an unrealistic or inappropriate depiction of the disorder schizophrenia, which the protagonist John Nash suffers from, stating that it places too much emphasis on “fixing” the disorder.

In June 2025, entertainer Mel Brooks cited A Beautiful Mind as among his favorite films of the 21st century.

In July 2025, it was one of the films voted for the "Readers' Choice" edition of The New York Times' list of "The 100 Best Movies of the 21st Century," finishing at number 265.

=== Awards and nominations ===
Award	Category	Recipient	Result
Academy Awards	Best Picture	Brian Grazer and Ron Howard	Won
Academy Awards	Best Director	Ron Howard	Won
Academy Awards	Best Actor	Russell Crowe	Nominated
Academy Awards	Best Supporting Actress	Jennifer Connelly	Won
Academy Awards	Best Screenplay – Based on Material Previously Produced or Published	Akiva Goldsman	Won
Academy Awards	Best Film Editing	Mike Hill and Daniel P. Hanley	Nominated
Academy Awards	Best Makeup	Greg Cannom and Colleen Callaghan	Nominated
Academy Awards	Best Original Score	James Horner	Nominated
Amanda Awards	Best Foreign Feature Film	Ron Howard	Nominated
American Cinema Editors Awards	Best Edited Feature Film – Dramatic	Mike Hill and Daniel P. Hanley	Nominated
American Film Institute Awards	Movie of the Year		Nominated
American Film Institute Awards	Actor of the Year – Male – Movies	Russell Crowe	Nominated
American Film Institute Awards	Featured Actor of the Year – Female – Movies	Jennifer Connelly	Won
American Film Institute Awards	Screenwriter of the Year	Akiva Goldsman	Nominated
Artios Awards	Outstanding Achievement in Feature Film Casting – Drama	Jane Jenkins and Janet Hirshenson	Nominated
ASCAP Film and Television Music Awards	Top Box Office Films	James Horner	Won
Australian Film Institute Awards	Best Foreign Film	Brian Grazer and Ron Howard	Nominated
Awards Circuit Community Awards	Best Actor in a Leading Role	Russell Crowe	Won
Awards Circuit Community Awards	Best Actress in a Supporting Role	Jennifer Connelly	Won
Awards Circuit Community Awards	Best Adapted Screenplay	Akiva Goldsman	Nominated
Awards Circuit Community Awards	Best Original Score	James Horner	Nominated
Awards Circuit Community Awards	Best Cast Ensemble	Paul Bettany, Jennifer Connelly, Russell Crowe, Adam Goldberg, Jason Gray-Stanford, Ed Harris, Judd Hirsch, Josh Lucas, Austin Pendleton, Christopher Plummer, and Anthony Rapp	Nominated
British Academy Film Awards	Best Film	Brian Grazer and Ron Howard	Nominated
British Academy Film Awards	Best Direction	Ron Howard	Nominated
British Academy Film Awards	Best Actor in a Leading Role	Russell Crowe	Won
British Academy Film Awards	Best Actress in a Supporting Role	Jennifer Connelly	Won
British Academy Film Awards	Best Adapted Screenplay	Akiva Goldsman	Nominated
Chicago Film Critics Association Awards	Best Film		Nominated
Chicago Film Critics Association Awards	Best Director	Ron Howard	Nominated
Chicago Film Critics Association Awards	Best Actor	Russell Crowe	Nominated
Chicago Film Critics Association Awards	Best Supporting Actress	Jennifer Connelly	Nominated
Chicago Film Critics Association Awards	Best Screenplay	Akiva Goldsman	Nominated
Chicago Film Critics Association Awards	Best Original Score	James Horner	Nominated
Christopher Awards	Feature Film		Won
Critics' Choice Awards	Best Picture		Won
Critics' Choice Awards	Best Director	Ron Howard	Won (Note: Tied with Baz Luhrmann for Moulin Rouge!.)
Critics' Choice Awards	Best Actor	Russell Crowe	Won
Critics' Choice Awards	Best Supporting Actress	Jennifer Connelly	Won
Critics' Choice Awards	Best Screenplay	Akiva Goldsman	Nominated
Czech Lion Awards	Best Foreign Film		Nominated
Dallas–Fort Worth Film Critics Association Awards	Best Picture		Won
Dallas–Fort Worth Film Critics Association Awards	Best Director	Ron Howard	Won
Dallas–Fort Worth Film Critics Association Awards	Best Actor	Russell Crowe	Won
Dallas–Fort Worth Film Critics Association Awards	Best Supporting Actress	Jennifer Connelly	Nominated
Directors Guild of America Awards	Outstanding Directorial Achievement in Motion Pictures	Ron Howard	Won
DVD Exclusive Awards	Best Audio Commentary – New Release	Ron Howard	Nominated
DVD Exclusive Awards	Original Retrospective Documentary – New Release	Colleen A. Benn and Marian Mansi	Nominated
Empire Awards	Best Actress	Jennifer Connelly	Nominated
Golden Eagle Awards	Best Foreign Language Film	Ron Howard	Nominated
Golden Globe Awards	Best Motion Picture – Drama		Won
Golden Globe Awards	Best Actor in a Motion Picture – Drama	Russell Crowe	Won
Golden Globe Awards	Best Supporting Actress – Motion Picture	Jennifer Connelly	Won
Golden Globe Awards	Best Director – Motion Picture	Ron Howard	Nominated
Golden Globe Awards	Best Screenplay – Motion Picture	Akiva Goldsman	Won
Golden Globe Awards	Best Original Score – Motion Picture	James Horner	Nominated
Golden Reel Awards	Best Sound Editing – Dialogue & ADR, Domestic Feature Film	Anthony J. Ciccolini III, Deborah Wallach, Stan Bochner, Louis Cerborino, and Marc Laub	Nominated
Golden Reel Awards	Best Sound Editing – Music (Foreign & Domestic)	Jim Henrikson	Nominated
Golden Schmoes Awards	Best Actor of the Year	Russell Crowe	Nominated
Golden Schmoes Awards	Best Supporting Actress of the Year	Jennifer Connelly	Won
GoldSpirit Awards	Best Soundtrack	James Horner	Nominated
GoldSpirit Awards	Best Drama Soundtrack	James Horner	Nominated
Grammy Awards	Best Score Soundtrack Album for a Motion Picture, Television or Other Visual Media	A Beautiful Mind: Original Motion Picture Soundtrack – James Horner	Nominated
Humanitas Prize	Feature Film Category	Akiva Goldsman	Nominated
Kansas City Film Critics Circle Awards	Best Supporting Actress	Jennifer Connelly	Won (Note: Tied with Maggie Smith for Gosford Park.)
Las Vegas Film Critics Society Awards	Best Supporting Actress	Jennifer Connelly	Nominated
London Film Critics Circle Awards	British Supporting Actor of the Year	Paul Bettany	Nominated
MTV Movie Awards	Best Male Performance	Russell Crowe	Nominated
Online Film & Television Association Awards	Best Picture	Brian Grazer and Ron Howard	Nominated
Online Film & Television Association Awards	Best Actor	Russell Crowe	Nominated
Online Film & Television Association Awards	Best Supporting Actress	Jennifer Connelly	Won
Online Film & Television Association Awards	Best Adapted Screenplay	Akiva Goldsman	Nominated
Online Film & Television Association Awards	Best Original Score	James Horner	Nominated
Online Film Critics Society Awards	Best Actor	Russell Crowe	Nominated
Online Film Critics Society Awards	Best Supporting Actress	Jennifer Connelly	Won
Producers Guild of America Awards	Outstanding Producer of Theatrical Motion Pictures	Brian Grazer and Ron Howard	Nominated
Phoenix Film Critics Society Awards	Best Picture		Nominated
Phoenix Film Critics Society Awards	Best Director	Ron Howard	Nominated
Phoenix Film Critics Society Awards	Best Actor in a Leading Role	Russell Crowe	Won
Phoenix Film Critics Society Awards	Best Actress in a Supporting Role	Jennifer Connelly	Won
Phoenix Film Critics Society Awards	Best Screenplay – Adaptation	Akiva Goldsman	Nominated
Phoenix Film Critics Society Awards	Best Original Score	James Horner	Nominated
Russian Guild of Film Critics Awards	Best Foreign Actor	Russell Crowe	Nominated
San Diego Film Critics Society Awards	Best Actor	Russell Crowe	Nominated
Satellite Awards	Best Actor in a Motion Picture – Drama	Russell Crowe	Nominated
Satellite Awards	Best Supporting Actor in a Motion Picture – Drama	Ed Harris	Nominated
Satellite Awards	Best Supporting Actress in a Motion Picture – Drama	Jennifer Connelly	Won
Satellite Awards	Best Adapted Screenplay	Akiva Goldsman	Nominated
Satellite Awards	Best Editing	Mike Hill and Daniel P. Hanley	Nominated
Satellite Awards	Best Original Score	James Horner	Nominated
Satellite Awards	Best Original Song	"All Love Can Be"; Music by James Horner; Lyrics by Will Jennings	Won
Screen Actors Guild Awards	Outstanding Performance by a Cast in a Motion Picture	Paul Bettany, Jennifer Connelly, Russell Crowe, Adam Goldberg, Jason Gray-Stanford, Ed Harris, Judd Hirsch, Josh Lucas, Austin Pendleton, Christopher Plummer, and Anthony Rapp	Nominated
Screen Actors Guild Awards	Outstanding Performance by a Male Actor in a Leading Role	Russell Crowe	Won
Screen Actors Guild Awards	Outstanding Performance by a Female Actor in a Leading Role	Jennifer Connelly	Nominated
Southeastern Film Critics Association Awards	Best Picture		7th Place (Note: Tied with Mulholland Drive.)
Southeastern Film Critics Association Awards	Best Supporting Actress	Jennifer Connelly	Won (Note: Tied with Maggie Smith for Gosford Park and Marisa Tomei for In the Bedroom.)
Teen Choice Awards	Choice Movie – Drama/Action Adventure		Nominated
Turkish Film Critics Association Awards	Best Foreign Film		12th Place
USC Scripter Awards		Akiva Goldsman (screenwriter); Sylvia Nasar (author)	Won
Vancouver Film Critics Circle Awards	Best Actor	Russell Crowe	Nominated
Voices in the Shadow Dubbing Festival	Best Male Voice	Fabrizio Pucci (for the dubbing of Russell Crowe)	Nominated
World Soundtrack Awards	Soundtrack Composer of the Year	James Horner	Nominated
Writers Guild of America Awards	Best Screenplay – Based on Material Previously Produced or Published	Akiva Goldsman	Won
Yoga Awards	Worst Foreign Director	Ron Howard	Won

- In 2006, it was named No. 93 in AFI's 100 Years... 100 Cheers.

== See also ==
- List of American films of 2001
- List of films about mathematicians
- Mental illness in films
