= Ruzi Nazar =

Uzbek nationalist and CIA officer

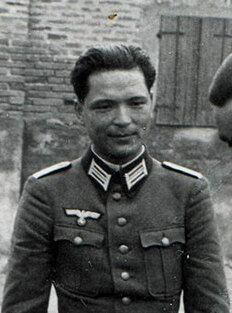

Personal details
- Born: Ruzi Nazar; 1 January 1917 Margilan, Russian Provisional Government (present-day Uzbekistan)
- Died: 30 April 2015 (aged 98) Fethiye, Turkey
- Spouse: Ermelinde Roth
- Children: 2, including Sylvia

Military service
- Allegiance: Soviet Union (until 1941); Nazi Germany (1941–1945); United States (from 1951)
- Branch/service: Red Army (1941); Turkestan Legion (1942–1945); CIA (1951–1990s)
- Years of service: 1941–1990s

Ruzi Nazar (Uzbek: Roʻzi Nazar; 1 January 1917 – 30 April 2015) was an Uzbek nationalist who spent most of his career working for the CIA against the Soviet Union. He was born in Soviet Central Asia at the time of the Russian Revolution. After joining the Turkestan Legion during World War II, Nazar lived most of his life in exile, first in Germany and then in the United States and Turkey. During three decades from the early 1950s he was a CIA officer serving for eleven years in the American Embassy in Ankara and then for a decade in Bonn. He also worked on clandestine missions in Tehran in 1979 and Afghanistan in the early 1980s.

== Early life ==
Nazar was born in Margilan in the Fergana Valley in what later became Uzbekistan in 1917. He attended school in his hometown and was later educated in Tashkent. Nazar's father, Jemshid Umirzakoglu, was a silk merchant from a family that had been engaged in silk production for many centuries. His mother, Tacinissa, came from a family prominent in the Khanate of Kokand before the Russian conquest, and was sympathetic to nationalist ideas. She had been taught Arabic, Persian, and Russian literature and was influenced by the late-19th and early-20th century Jadid movement among Turkic Muslims, which advocated modernisation in order to resist Russian rule.

When Nazar was ten, his elder brother Yoldash Kari was executed by the Soviets for involvement in nationalist resistance. This event made his father decide to give his son a modern education. Nazar attended high school in Margilan and then studied economics in Tashkent, also taking night classes in chemistry. Nazar also worked in the local youth wing of the Uzbekistan Communist Party but was accused of belonging to a nationalist group and was temporarily expelled, though after a visit to Moscow to appeal against the decision, he and his friends managed to regain their membership.

During the 1930s prominent Turkestani poets and writers, and later the local Communist Party leadership, were denounced by the Soviet authorities and either exiled and imprisoned or placed on trial. Nazar followed such trials closely in his hometown.

== Second World War ==
In January 1941 Nazar was drafted into the Red Army and when war broke out between Nazi Germany and Russia in the spring of that year he was sent to the front in Ukraine. A few weeks later, during the German rout of the Red Army, Ruzi was badly wounded and cut off from his unit. He was then sheltered nursed back to health by a Ukrainian family and given a false identity. He was eventually captured by the Germans to whom he offered his services as an intelligence asset. He was involved in establishing the Turkestan Legion comprised by Turkic captives from the Soviet Union.

Ruzi was wounded again fighting on the Eastern Front and was assigned to a liaison position with the National Unity Committee of Turkestan (NUCT), the nationalist Turkestan leadership in Berlin. From then onwards Nazar was closely involved in Turkestani émigré politics. During World War II his work involved looking after the interests and needs of legionnaires on the front and fending off attempts by Russian renegade groups, such as the General Andrey Vlasov's pro-German Russian Liberation Army to take over the Turkestani and other non-Russian legions. At the same time there was a fierce conflict between the Turkestani nationalists in Berlin and Himmler (and the SS), who backed Vlasov and the Russians. In later years, Nazar was frequently accused by Russian and left-wing opponents of having worked with the SS.

In the spring of 1945, the Turkestani Legion was withdrawn from the Eastern Front and its remnants were stationed in Northern Italy around Bolzano. Nazar was personally assigned the task of reconstructing it by the Commander-in-Chief of the Wehrmacht, Wilhelm Keitel. Nazar, who was aware of the Allies’ agreement at Yalta to repatriate all former Red Army soldiers and citizens in Germany to the Soviet Union, regarded this as a key opportunity to save his fellow countrymen from certain execution.

However, by April 1945 the American army was advancing into northern Italy and German occupation rule had more or less collapsed, Ruzi discovered that his mission was impossible and decided to return to Germany.

== Postwar Germany ==
Ruzi returned to Germany in the closing days of the war as the Allies closed in by air and land. He managed to get documents discharging himself and his friends from the military, thus prudently altering their legal status. When Germany accepted defeat in May 1945, he was in the Bavarian town of Rosenheim where, thanks to two German families, he was sheltered and avoided being found and arrested by Allied soldiers and sent to certain death before a Soviet firing squad.

As peacetime conditions returned in Rosenheim, now part of the American occupation zone, Nazar emerged from hiding. He got to know Ermelinde Roth, the daughter of a prominent anti-Nazi Catholic Bavarian judge, and they married towards the end of 1946. In August the following year, their first child Sylvia was born.

Until 1951 Nazar had a precarious existence, struggling to earn a living while working with Ukrainian and Central Asian nationalists with the Anti-Bolshevik Bloc of Nations in Munich, a joint platform for non-Russian peoples seeking independence, set up by his friends Stepan Bandera and Yaroslav Stetsko.

== CIA career ==
Having evidently been talent-spotted by the Americans perhaps because of his success in unmasking a Soviet mole among the Turkestani exiles, Nazar was invited in 1951 by Archibald Roosevelt Jr. of the CIA to go to the United States to work in a new Central Asian Unit in Columbia University. Once in New York he supplemented his income with broadcasts in Uzbek for Voice of America.

Within a few years however, Nazar had joined the CIA as a career officer and moved to Washington. On behalf of his new employers, he attended the Bandung Conference of Non-Aligned Countries in Indonesia in April 1955 and drew attention to the colonial plight of non-Russian populations in Russia and China. In September 1955 he attended the Cairo Non-Aligned Conference in a similar capacity and the Seventh World Festival of Youth and Students in Vienna in July and August 1959, during which he met privately with Turkey's most famous 20th-century poet, the exiled Communist Nâzım Hikmet, who he later recalled advised him to ‘stay away from politics and politicians.’ His work on such occasions seems to have been a combination of promoting awareness of the colonial situation of the non-Russian peoples of the Soviet Union and trying to identify Soviet infiltrators and agents.

== Nazar’s years in Turkey ==
From the end of 1959 until 1971, Nazar worked in the American Embassy in Ankara. Shortly after his arrival in Turkey, there was a military coup in Ankara on 27 May 1960. One of its leading figures, Colonel Alparslan Türkeş, had been a close friend of Nazar's since 1955 when he served in Washington in the Turkish Permanent Delegation to NATO.

Nazar's close personal friendship with Türkeş continued after the latter was purged from the ruling junta, the National Unity Committee, on 13 November 1960. Nazar's biographer, Enver Altaylı says that Ruzi intervened via the US ambassador, to ensure that Türkeş and his colleagues were not executed, but this claim is disputed by some Turkish relatives of the purged men.

Frequently accused by Turkish leftists of being far-right in his work for the CIA, Nazar claimed that he had worked to prevent further military coups being staged by left-wing army officers in 1971 and had helped Turkey's intelligence service, MIT, to modernize itself and become operationally autonomous after years of dependency on the U.S.A.

A notable moment in Nazar's years in Ankara came in 1965 when his mother and sister broadcast an appeal to him over Tashkent Radio. This was the only indication he had that they knew he was still alive after a quarter of a century. His sister broadcast a standard appeal to him to return home but his mother ignored her script and told him to go on living happily where he was.

After leaving Turkey after eleven years in Ankara in 1971, Nazar worked in Washington and Bonn for the rest of his career, cooperating closely with Zbigniew Brzezinski on publications contrasting the Western capitalist system with Soviet Communism. Inside the CIA and American administration he held a minority opinion arguing that nationalism was still strong among the non-Russian peoples of the Soviet Union and that the combination of the nationalities problem and the weakness of the Soviet economy meant that the USSR faced likely collapse at an early date.

== Clandestine operation in Iran in 1979 ==
In 1979 Nazar entered Iran under cover presenting himself as a German-Afghan carpet seller in order get informed on the situation of the hostages in the US embassy and assess the possibilities of an eventual rescue. He took part on the ground in the successful CIA clandestine operation 'Argo' (which in 2013 became the subject of a film though Nazar's presence is not mentioned) to rescue six American diplomatic personnel who had been stranded outside the embassy at the time of its occupation. On return he advised the U.S. government strongly against a direct military operation to rescue the hostages, but failed to convince the U.S. military who went ahead with the abortive Operation Eagle Claw.

== Afghanistan ==
Later Nazar made several trips to Afghanistan then under Soviet occupation to recruit Uzbek deserters from the Red Army. He held talks with Gulbuddin Hekmetyar, the hardline anti-Western mujahid Islamist leader supported by the US against the Russians, and – drawing on his own moderate Muslim background – strongly advised the US government not to back radical Islamists. He says that again his advice was overruled by U.S. policy-makers.

== Return to Central Asia after the fall of Communism ==
After the collapse of the Soviet Union and the declaration of independence by Uzbekistan in September 1991, Nazar was at last free to return to his homeland after 50 years. He paid his first visit to Tashkent and Margilan in May 1992, being given a hero's reception by President Islam Karimov and the Uzbek government. He was also reunited with surviving friends and family.

== Personal life ==
Nazar has two children, a daughter, Sylvia, a professor of Business Journalism at Columbia University, best known as the author of the John Forbes Nash Jr. biographical book A Beautiful Mind, and a son, Erkin.
