= Michael Laudor =

American schizophrenia patient (born 1963)

Michael B. Laudor
- Jonathan Rosen (left) and Michael Laudor (right) in extracurricular activity group photo, New Rochelle High School yearbook, 1979
- Born: May 12, 1963 (age 63)
- Education: Yale University (BA, JD)

Michael B. Laudor (born May 12, 1963) is an American graduate of Yale Law School who made national headlines in 1995 for having successfully graduated while suffering from schizophrenia. In 1998, he stabbed to death his pregnant fiancée, Caroline Costello, during an episode of psychosis.

== Early life and career ==
Laudor was born in 1963 to parents Charles, an economics professor at Adelphi University, and Ruth. He grew up in New Rochelle, New York and was raised Jewish. As a child, Laudor was known to be intellectually gifted and a voracious reader, performing well in school despite often cutting class to practice jazz guitar. While in high school, Laudor was chosen to take part in the prestigious Telluride Association Summer Program at Cornell University. He went on to attend Yale University as an undergraduate, from which he graduated a year early with two majors and summa cum laude honors.

Laudor's first job after graduation was as a consultant at Bain and Company. Once there, he started to develop his first symptoms of schizophrenia; namely, a constant fear that his phone lines at work had been tapped. Due to this and the associated pressures of work, Laudor left Bain in 1985 to pursue a writing career. Laudor's psychiatric symptoms escalated during this period, however, as he started to imagine that musician friends of his were members of a cult, that his room had become engulfed in flames, or that his parents had been killed and replaced by Neo-Nazi agents. Eventually, Laudor was hospitalized at New York-Presbyterian Hospital, where he stayed for eight months, and was given a schizophrenia diagnosis.

== Law school and recognition ==
Following his release from hospital, Laudor's doctors suggested to him that he get a job as a cashier at Macy's, but his father convinced him instead to attend Yale Law School, where he had applied shortly before becoming ill. Upon hearing of his illness, Yale Law School Dean Guido Calabresi reportedly said to Laudor: "If you were here, and your problem or illness was that you needed a wheelchair and a ramp, there would be a wheelchair and a ramp. It isn’t so easy to do, but I will be your wheelchair and ramp." Despite his schizophrenia symptoms continuing to affect him, Laudor graduated with honors in 1992 and was offered a two-year research associate fellowship by his professors. Laudor published at least two legal articles during this time: "Disability and Community: Modes of Exclusion, Norms of Inclusion, and the Americans with Disabilities Act of 1990" in the Syracuse Law Review and "In Defense of Wrongful Life: Bringing Political Theory to the Defense of a Tort" in the Fordham Law Review.

Laudor attempted to find a job as a law professor after his fellowship without success. While seeking employment, his story of overcoming his mental illness was profiled in a 1995 New York Times article by journalist Lisa Foderaro. Upon reading the article, film director Ron Howard bought the rights to Laudor's life story for $1.5 million, planning to turn it into a movie with Brad Pitt as the lead role. The article also earned Laudor a $600,000 book advance from Scribner's, an imprint of Simon and Schuster, for an autobiography. Both the movie and the book were intended to be called Laws of Madness.

== Murder of Caroline Costello ==
Laudor began dating his fiancée, Caroline Costello, in 1990, while he was in law school and she was working at IBM, though the two had first met as Yale undergraduates in 1983. Costello was aware of Laudor's schizophrenia since the first few months of the relationship. At the time of her murder, the couple lived together in an apartment in Hastings-on-Hudson, New York. Costello, aged 37, worked as the associate director of technology for the Edison Project (now EdisonLearning), an education management organization, and was pregnant with the couple's first child. The pair had a loving relationship, even as Laudor continued to be prone to schizophrenic delusions, believing at times that Costello was an alien impostor and refusing to let her in the apartment.

Leading up to Costello's murder, Laudor's antipsychotic medications had become less effective at curbing his symptoms, resulting in him becoming depressed and withdrawn, and failing to make progress on his autobiography. Some sources claim that Laudor had recently stopped taking his medication altogether. The 1995 death of Laudor's father Charles, a critical source of support who had often talked Laudor through his hallucinations, was also said to have contributed to his mental decline.

On June 17, 1998, Costello was found stabbed to death in the couple's apartment. Laudor had been experiencing a particularly severe psychotic episode that day, to the point where Costello had told her boss in the morning that she could not come to work due to a "personal emergency". After attempting to defuse the situation on the phone, Laudor's mother Ruth called the police urging them to conduct a welfare check on the couple. Laudor was apprehended for the crime 170 miles away on the campus of Cornell University in Ithaca, New York, after he had driven there and promptly turned himself in to campus police. It is unclear why Laudor drove to Cornell, as he had no known connections to the university besides his time there in high school.

Laudor was charged with second-degree murder by Jeanine Pirro, then the district attorney of Westchester County, but did not stand trial as prosecutors accepted Laudor's plea of not guilty by reason of mental defect. This conclusion was supported by three psychiatrists, who argued that Laudor believed his fiancée was "a nonperson, a robot or a doll... planning to kill or torture him". One psychiatric report claimed that an impending crisis intervention team visit arranged by Laudor's mother and doctor had triggered Laudor's fears of being tortured and lobotomized. According to Laudor's lawyer, Laudor had not realized that Costello was dead for six weeks after his arrest, and as a friend of Laudor's later recounted, he had been confused about why Costello was not visiting him in custody. Pirro stated that she was obligated to accept the insanity plea but criticized that the case would not go to trial, as did Costello's mother and sister. Costello was buried in her hometown of Newton, Massachusetts.

== Later developments ==
Laudor was committed to the Mid-Hudson Forensic Psychiatric Center in New Hampton, New York and remains institutionalized there as of 2023. Laudor's movie and book deals were canceled, with Ron Howard going on to make A Beautiful Mind in 2001 about schizophrenic mathematician John Nash, whose story was deemed more palatable for audiences. A Beautiful Mind went on to win four Academy Awards, including Best Picture.

In April 2023, a close friend of Laudor's since childhood, Jonathan Rosen, published a memoir centered on Laudor's life entitled The Best Minds: A Story of Friendship, Madness, and the Tragedy of Good Intentions. The book has received significant praise from critics.
