= Alice Lardé de Venturino =

Salvadoran poet, scientist and composer (1895-1983)

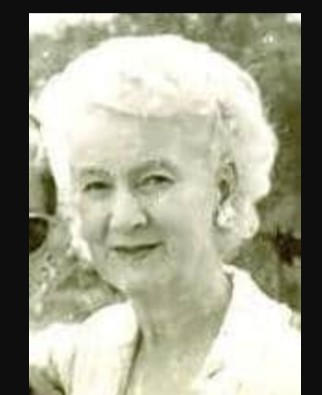
- 1934
- Born: Alice Lardé Arthés; 29 June 1895; San Salvador, El Salvador
- Died: 13 October 1983 (aged 88)
- Occupation: Writer
- Years active: 1919–1983
- Relatives: Alicia Nash (niece); John Forbes Nash Jr. (nephew-in-law)

Alice Lardé de Venturino (29 June 1895 – 14 October 1983) was a Salvadoran poet and writer. Internationally recognized for her lyric poems, Lardé also published scientific works. She has been recognized by the Legislative Assembly of El Salvador and the government of Chile, both of whom have renamed public streets and offices in her name.

Important poet and writer. Internationally recognized for her lyric poems and scientific works

== Early life ==
Alice Lardé Arthés was born on 29 June 1895 in San Salvador, El Salvador to Amalia Arthés Echeverría and Jorge Lardé Bourdon. Her father was of French heritage and was born in Baton Rouge, Louisiana, coming to El Salvador at the age of eleven in 1869. Her father was a chemical engineer and her mother was a teacher. Lardé was one of eight siblings: Jorge, Coralie, Luis, Alice, Maria, Carlos, Enrique and Zelie, who grew up on a farm near Lake Ilopango. The family was well-to-do and the children had a privileged education. Her brother Jorge would become a noted geologist and seismologist, her brother Enrique was a writer and editor, and her sister Zélie would become a noted painter. Carlos became a surgeon and moved to the United States, where his daughter, Alicia became the spouse of Nobel Laureate, John Forbes Nash Jr.

== Career ==
Lardé's first publications appeared in the Salvadoran magazine Espiral in 1919. The journal was edited by Miguel Ángel Chacón and her brother, Enrique and she collaborated with it through 1922. In 1921, she published her first volume of poetry, Pétalos del alma (Petals of the Soul) in San Salvador. On 16 July 1924, she married the Chilean sociologist, Agustín Venturino Poetry books followed, including Alma viril (Virile soul, 1925), Sangre del trópico (Blood of the Tropics, 1925) which were both published in Santiago. The couple soon moved to Buenos Aires, where she continued to write and publish for the newspaper Patria. While she was in Argentina, she served as a delegate for El Salvador to the Feminist Encounter, held in 1925. She also collaborated with Mexican newspapers, publishing in El Heraldo, Excélsior, and La Revista de Yucatán, among others. In 1927, Lardé was a delegate to the International Feminist Congress in Favor of Peace, held in Brazil. Fifty-six of her poems were included in volume 53 of the anthology Poesías: colección las mejores poesías (líricas) de los mejores poetas (Poetry: collection the best poetry (lyric) of the best women poets, 1926). It, like Belleza salvaje (Wild Beauty, 1927) and El nuevo mundo polar (The New Polar World, 1929) were published in Spain. Mexican poet and member of the Mexican Academy of Language, Juan B. Delgado compared Lardé's skill with words comparable to those of Gabriela Mistral or Alfonsina Storni.

In 1939, Lardé was recognized in Chile when both a library and a public school were named in her honor. From the 1940s, many of her publications included scientific works including: La dinámica terrestre y sus fenómenos inherentes (The terrestrial dynamics and its inherent phenomena, 1943), ¿Es la electricidad el origen de la vida y de la muerte? (Is electricity the origin of life and death?, 1943), Mi América: Odisea de un Colegial Salvadoreño a través de Centro y Sudamérica (My America: Odyssey of a Salvadoran Scholar through Central and South America, 1946), Fórmulas gráficas prácticas del vitaoculiscopio y oculivita (Practical graphic formulas of vitaoculiscope and oculivita, 1950), La Electricidad: Alma Mater Universal, Fenómenos Cosmológicos y Biopsicológicos, (Electricity: Universal Soul, Cosmological and Psychological Phenomena, 1954), La frigidez sexual de la mujer (The sexual frigidity of women, 1967), El Volumen Poético Antológico Grito al Sol, (The Anthological Poetry Volume Greetings to the Sun, 1983).

In November 1976, Lardé was honored by the Legislative Assembly of El Salvador and in 1979, she was honored by the Unión de Mujeres Americanas as the Woman of the Year.

== Death and legacy ==
Lardé died on 13 October 1983 leaving around thirty unpublished manuscripts. In 1998, a postage stamp bearing her likeness was issued in a series Celebrating Women. In 2003, she was selected with a group of noted Salvadoran women as one of the names to be included in a street and park renaming project. The National Library of El Salvador hosted an exhibition, El legado literario de mujeres escritoras (The literary legacy of women writers) in 2016. The event featured the works of the three dominant Salvadoran poets of their era: Lardé, along with Prudencia Ayala and Josefina Peñate y Hernández.
