= Alicia Nash =

Salvadoran-American physicist (1933–2015)

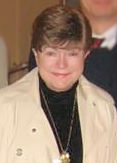
- Nash in 2006
- Born: Alicia Esther Lardé Lopez-Harrison; January 1, 1933; San Salvador, El Salvador
- Died: May 23, 2015 (aged 82); Monroe Township, New Jersey, U.S.
- Education: Massachusetts Institute of Technology
- Occupation: Physicist
- Spouses: John Forbes Nash Jr. (m. 1957; div. 1963) (m. 2001; their deaths 2015)
- Children: 1. John Charles Martin Nash
- Relatives: Alice Lardé de Venturino (aunt)

Alicia Esther Nash (née Lardé Lopez-Harrison (Note: In this Spanish name, the first or paternal surname is Lardé and the second or maternal family name is Lopez-Harrison.); January 1, 1933 – May 23, 2015) was a Salvadoran-American physicist. The wife of mathematician John Forbes Nash Jr., she was a mental-health care advocate, who gave up her professional aspirations to support her husband and son, who were both diagnosed with schizophrenia.

Her life with Nash was chronicled in the 1998 book, A Beautiful Mind by Sylvia Nasar, as well as in the 2001 film of the same title directed by Ron Howard, in which she was portrayed by Jennifer Connelly.

== Personal life ==
Alicia Lardé Lopez-Harrison was born on January 1, 1933, in El Salvador, the daughter of Alicia Lopez-Harrison and Carlos Lardé, a doctor. The Lardé Lopez-Harrison family also included two boys, Carlos and Rolando Lardé. Both of her parents came from socially prominent, well-travelled families who spoke several languages. Her aunt was the poet Alice Lardé de Venturino; her paternal grandfather was Jorge Lardé, a chemical engineer.

When Lardé was a child, her father traveled to the United States a few times before deciding to move the family there permanently in 1944. After first settling in Biloxi, Mississippi, the family later moved to New York City. Lardé was accepted to the Marymount School with the help of a letter of recommendation from El Salvador's Ambassador to the United States. Following graduation from Marymount, Lardé was accepted into Massachusetts Institute of Technology, to study physics. She was one of very few women studying at MIT in the 1950s. There she met her future husband, John Forbes Nash, Jr.

Despite signs of Nash's mental illness which had emerged in the early 1950s, the couple married in 1957. In 1958, Alicia became pregnant with their son, John Charles Martin Nash. Like his father, John Charles would later develop schizophrenia. Shortly before their son's birth in 1959, Nash was committed to McLean Hospital to receive psychiatric treatment for his illness. After spending 50 days in hospital, he was released, but over the following years he was committed three more times, including commitments initiated by his sister. The strain of his illness led to the couple's divorce in 1963. After Nash's mother died in 1968, he asked Alicia to allow him to return to live with her. He moved back in with her in 1970, and although they remained divorced, Alicia cared for her former husband for many years. The couple remarried in 2001.

In 2002, the couple visited her native country, El Salvador, where she was honored by President Francisco Flores Pérez with a tribute to her life.

== Career ==
After graduation from MIT, Nash went to work for the Brookhaven Nuclear Development Corporation as a lab physicist. In the early 1960s, she worked for RCA as an aerospace engineer, but was laid off. She then worked for years at Con Edison as a system programmer and later for the New Jersey Transit system as a computer programmer and data analyst. She was a member of numerous women's engineering societies. When the film A Beautiful Mind was released, Alicia Nash was serving as president of MIT's Alumni Association Board.

== Mental health advocacy ==
Nash became a spokesperson for schizophrenia and mental illness. In 2005 she was given the Luminary Award from the Brain & Behavior Research Foundation. She travelled around the country to discuss rights for those with mental illness, and in 2009 she met with New Jersey state lawmakers to discuss how to improve that state's mental health care system. In 2012, she was honored at the University of Texas at Austin's John and Alicia Nash Conference for her support of those with mental illness, where she delivered the keynote address.

== Death ==
Alicia and her husband were killed in a car crash on the New Jersey Turnpike on May 23, 2015, in Monroe Township, New Jersey. They were on their way home after a visit to Norway, where her husband had been awarded the Abel Prize. The driver of the taxicab they were riding in from Newark Airport lost control of the cab and struck a guardrail. Because neither were wearing seatbelts, both passengers were ejected and killed.

== Portrayal in media ==
Alicia was portrayed by Jennifer Connelly in the 2001 film A Beautiful Mind. For her performance, Connelly won the Academy Award for Best Supporting Actress, mentioning Nash during her acceptance speech. Writing in the Los Angeles Times, Lisa Navarrette criticized Connelly's casting as an example of whitewashing.
