= Zélie Lardé =

Salvadoran painter (1901–1974)

- Zélie Lardé Arthés
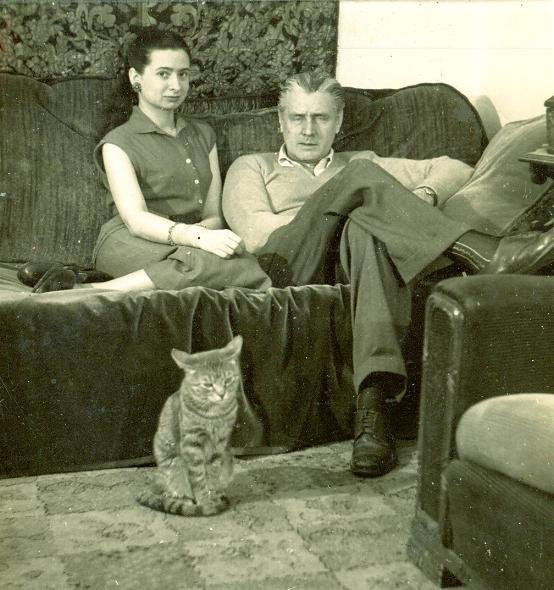
- Born: 11 August 1901; San Salvador, El Salvador
- Died: 27 October 1974 (aged 73); San Salvador, El Salvador
- Occupation: painter
- Movement: Primitivism

Zélie Lardé Arthés (1901–1974) was a Salvadoran painter, considered the first Primitivist painter in El Salvador.

== Early life ==
Zélie Lardé was born on 11 August 1901 in San Salvador, El Salvador. Her brother was a scientist and archaeologist Jorge Lardé y Arthés. Her sister, Alice Lardé de Venturino was also a poet, and pedagogue in El Salvador.

== Career ==
Zélie Lardé was a self-taught practitioner in arts and painting. She was the first in El Salvador to adopt the Russian art movement Primitivism, which later became a large movement in the 1970s in El Salvador.

== Personal life ==
In 1923, Zélie married the Salvadoran artist Salazar Arrué. They had three daughters – María Teresa, Aída Estela, and Olga Teresa. She later became the mother in law to the famous United States mathematician John Forbes Nash.

== Death ==
In 1974 she died in San Salvador, battling cancer.

== Selected works ==
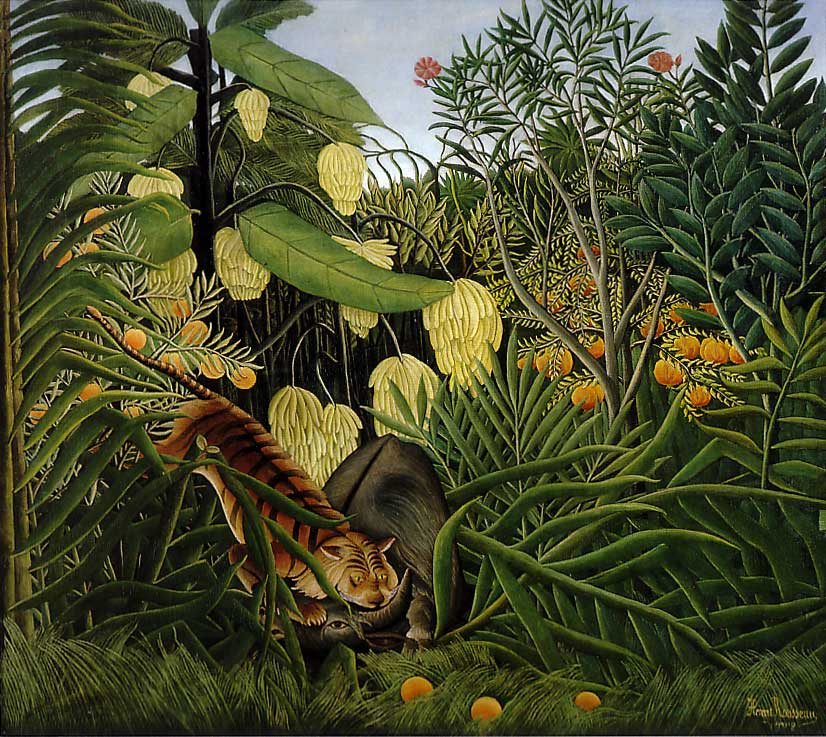
An exemplary Primitivist painting by Henri Rousseau – Fight Between a Tiger and a Buffalo

The majority of her works were represented by expressionist strokes of thick lines, using pure colors to express scenes of traditional Salvadoran daily life of peasants and lower society, as well as marginal sectors. The majority of her work can be found as illustrations in the first edition of the book by Salazar Arrué - "Cuentes de Cipotes" (1961).

Other notable works of hers include:

- "Cuentos de cipotes", 1961
- Día de Fiesta
- Recreo de escuela
- Familia
