= A Beautiful Mind (soundtrack) =

Film score by James Horner
- Released: December 11, 2001
- Recorded: 2001
- Genres: Classical, jazz, stage & screen
- Label: Decca Records
- Producers: James Horner, Simon Rhodes

James Horner chronology
Enemy at the Gates (2001)	A Beautiful Mind (2001)	Iris (2001)

A Beautiful Mind is the original soundtrack album, on the Decca Records label, of the 2001 film A Beautiful Mind starring Russell Crowe, Jennifer Connelly (who won the Academy Award for Best Supporting Actress for her role as "Alicia Nash"), Christopher Plummer and Paul Bettany. The original score and songs were composed and conducted by James Horner and performed by the Hollywood Studio Symphony.

The album garnered nominations for the Golden Globe Award for Best Original Score and the Academy Award for Best Original Score. Music critics felt that the musical score fit the film well, but believed it to be similar to several of Horner's previous films.

== Development ==
Composer James Horner was a frequent collaborator with Ron Howard, the director of A Beautiful Mind. Horner desired to feature vocals reminiscent of being midway between a girl and woman, and wrote the score specifically for 15-year-old Welsh singer Charlotte Church. To convey "the beauty of mathematics", Horner decided to use the idea of a kaleidoscope, as its "patterns are always changing, and things move very quickly, but in moving so quickly, they create other patterns that move very slowly underneath". He added that these changing patterns were conveyed with the piano and Church's voice.

== Release and reception ==
Professional ratings
Review scores
Source	Rating
Filmtracks.com	4/5 stars
Soundtrack.net	3/5 stars

Writing for Empire magazine, Danny Graydon gave the soundtrack four out of five stars. He thought the score contained elements of Horner's previous films Sneakers (1992) and Bicentennial Man (1999), but said "if you can forgive that, this is a clever, masterful and romantic score that captures a brilliant mind in conflict". In the tracks "Creating Government Dynamics" and "Cracking The Russian Codes", Graydon opined that Church's "poignant vocals mix well with the frenetic piano and strings to represent Nash’s brilliance" and wished that her voice had been used more in the film.

Dan Goldwasser of Soundtrack.net also found similarities to the score in Bicentennial Man, but thought Horner's work fit the film regardless, explaining "it effectively underscores the drama and romance, and even provides a few bits of tension for the action scene". Goldwasser concluded that "while it all works well in the film, there is enough about this score that just seemed to [sic] 'familiar' to make it stand out". Contributing to National Public Radio, Andy Trudeau believed Church's particular voice adds a "human element. It's the sound that, I think, gives a sense of--the center of this character, if you will. I think it's the soul. And it's trying to be normal in a way, and underneath it it's trying to be crazy".

Horner's score garnered nominations for the Golden Globe Award for Best Original Score and the Academy Award for Best Original Score. It lost the Golden Globe to the film Moulin Rouge! and the Oscar to The Lord of the Rings: The Fellowship of the Ring.

== Track listing ==
Adapted from:

No.	Title
1	"A Kaleidoscope of Mathematics"
2	"Playing a Game of 'Go!'"
3	"Looking for the Next Great Idea"
4	"Creating 'Governing Dynamics'"
5	"Cracking the Russian Codes"
6	"Nash Descends into Parcher's World"
7	"First Drop-Off, First Kiss"
8	"The Car Chase"
9	"Alicia Discovers Nash's Dark World"
10	"Real or Imagined?"
11	"Of One Heart, of One Mind"
12	"Saying Goodbye to Those You So Love"
13	"Teaching Mathematics Again"
14	"The Prize of One's Life... The Prize of One's Mind"
15	"All Love Can Be" (Charlotte Church)
16	"Closing Credits"
