= Open Problems in Mathematics =

Book published in 2016

- Editor: John Forbes Nash Jr. and Michael Th. Rassias
- Language: English
- Genre: Mathematics
- Publisher: Springer
- Publication date: 2016
- ISBN: 978-3-319-32160-8

Open Problems in Mathematics is a book, edited by John Forbes Nash Jr. and Michael Th. Rassias, published in 2016 by Springer (ISBN 978-3-319-32160-8). The book consists of seventeen expository articles, written by outstanding researchers, on some of the central open problems in the field of mathematics. The book also features an Introduction on John Nash: Theorems and Ideas, by Mikhail Leonidovich Gromov. According to the editors’ Preface, each article is devoted to one open problem or a “constellation of related problems”.

== Choice of problems ==
Nash and Rassias write in the preface of the book that the open problems presented “were chosen for a variety of reasons. Some were chosen for their undoubtedly importance and applicability, others because they constitute intriguing curiosities which remain unexplained mysteries on the basis of current knowledge and techniques, and some for more emotional reasons. Additionally, the attribute of a problem having a somewhat vintage flavor was also influential” in their decision process.

== Table of contents ==
- Preface, by John F. Nash Jr. and Michael Th. Rassias
- A Farewell to “A Beautiful Mind and a Beautiful Person”, by Michael Th. Rassias
- Introduction, John Nash: Theorems and Ideas, by Mikhail Leonidovich Gromov
- P =? NP, by Scott Aaronson
- From Quantum Systems to L-Functions: Pair Correlation Statistics and Beyond, by Owen Barrett, Frank W. K. Firk, Steven J. Miller, and Caroline Turnage-Butterbaugh
- The Generalized Fermat Equation, by Michael Bennett, Preda Mihăilescu, and Samir Siksek
- The Conjecture of Birch and Swinnerton-Dyer, by John H. Coates
- An Essay on the Riemann Hypothesis, by Alain Connes
- Navier–Stokes Equations: A Quick Reminder and a Few Remarks, by Peter Constantin
- Plateau’s Problem, by Jenny Harrison and Harrison Pugh
- The Unknotting Problem, by Louis Kauffman
- How Can Cooperative Game Theory Be Made More Relevant to Economics?: An Open Problem, by Eric Maskin
- The Erdős–Szekeres Problem, by Walter Morris and Valeriu Soltan
- Novikov’s Conjecture, by Jonathan Rosenberg
- The Discrete Logarithm Problem, by René Schoof
- Hadwiger’s Conjecture, by Paul Seymour
- The Hadwiger–Nelson Problem, by Alexander Soifer
- Erdős’s Unit Distance Problem, by Endre Szemerédi
- Goldbach’s Conjectures: A Historical Perspective, by Robert Charles Vaughan
- The Hodge Conjecture, by Claire Voisin
