= Jonathan Rosen =

American author

- Education: Yale University (BA); University of California, Berkeley
- Occupations: Author, editor
- Employer(s): The Jewish Daily Forward, Nextbook, The Free Press
- Notable work: Joy Comes in the Morning (2004), The Best Minds (2023)

Jonathan Rosen is an American author and editor.

== Education ==
Rosen graduated from Yale and began graduate studies working toward a PhD in English at the University of California, Berkeley. He dropped out of graduate school to become a writer.

== Career ==
In 1990 Rosen was hired by Seth Lipsky at The Jewish Daily Forward to create an arts section of the paper's then newly editorially independent English language edition. He held the job for 10 years. As of 2007, he was editorial director of Nextbook.

Rosen's novel Joy Comes in the Morning (2004) features a protagonist, Rabbi Deborah Green, who struggles with the perceptions of women rabbis. This work's inclusion of a woman rabbi is viewed as a significant development in American Jewish writings featuring women rabbis.

In April 2023, Rosen published The Best Minds: A Story of Friendship, Madness, and the Tragedy of Good Intentions, a memoir about his friendship with Michael Laudor, a Yale Law School graduate with schizophrenia who killed his fiancée in 1998 during a psychotic episode. The book was a finalist for a Pulitzer Prize and has received high critical acclaim.

In August 2024, Rosen was hired as an editor at The Free Press.

== Personal life ==
He lives in Manhattan with his wife, a Conservative rabbi, and their daughters.

== Bibliography ==
- Rosen, Jonathan (1997). Eve's apple: a novel. New York: Random House. ISBN 9780679448167.
- The Life of the Skies: Birding at the End of Nature MacMillan, 2008.
- The Talmud and the Internet: a journey between worlds, Farrar, Straus and Giroux, 2000. (0374272387)
- Joy comes in the morning, Farrar, Straus and Giroux, 2004. (0374180261)
- — (January 6, 2014). "The birds: why the passenger pigeon became extinct". The Critics. Books. The New Yorker. Vol. 89, no. 43. pp. 62–67.
- — (April 18, 2023). The Best Minds: A Story of Friendship, Madness, and the Tragedy of Good Intentions (1st ed.). Penguin Press. ISBN 978-1594206573.
