= World Soundtrack Awards 2002 =

Belgian music awards ceremony

2nd World Soundtrack Awards

October 19, 2002

Best Original Soundtrack:
The Lord of the Rings:
The Fellowship of the Ring

The 2nd World Soundtrack Awards were awarded on 19 October 2002 in Ghent, Belgium.

== Winners ==
- Soundtrack Composer of the Year:
  - Patrick Doyle - Gosford Park
- Best Original Soundtrack of the Year:
  - The Lord of the Rings: The Fellowship of the Ring - Howard Shore
- Best Original Song Written for a Film:
  - ""If I Didn't Have You" - Monsters, Inc.
    - Composed by: Randy Newman
    - Performed by: Billy Crystal and John Goodman
- Public Choice Award:
  - The Lord of the Rings: The Fellowship of the Ring - Howard Shore
- Discovery of the Year:
  - Klaus Badelt - The Time Machine
- Lifetime Achievement Award:
  - Sir George Martin
