= Nash blowing-up =

Process in algebraic geometry

In algebraic geometry, Nash blowing-up is a process in which, roughly speaking, each singular point is replaced by all limiting positions of the tangent spaces at the non-singular points. More formally, let $X$ be an algebraic variety of pure dimension r embedded in a smooth variety $Y$ of dimension n, and let $X_\text{reg}$ be the complement of the singular locus of $X$. Define a map $\tau:X_\text{reg}\rightarrow X\times G_{r}(TY)$, where $G_{r}(TY)$ is the Grassmannian of r-planes in the tangent bundle of $Y$, by $\tau(a):=(a,T_{X,a})$, where $T_{X,a}$ is the tangent space of $X$ at $a$. The closure of the image of this map together with the projection to $X$ is called the Nash blow-up of $X$.

Although the above construction uses an embedding, the Nash blow-up itself is unique up to unique isomorphism.

== Properties ==
- Nash blowing-up is locally a monoidal transformation.
- If X is a complete intersection defined by the vanishing of $f_1,f_2,\ldots,f_{n-r}$ then the Nash blow-up is the blow-up with center given by the ideal generated by the (n − r)-minors of the matrix with entries $\partial f_i/\partial x_j$.
- For a variety over a field of characteristic zero, the Nash blow-up is an isomorphism if and only if X is non-singular.
- For an algebraic curve over an algebraically closed field of characteristic zero, repeated Nash blowing-up leads to desingularization after a finite number of steps.
- Both of the prior properties may fail in positive characteristic. For example, in characteristic q > 0, the curve $y^2-x^q=0$ has a Nash blow-up which is the monoidal transformation with center given by the ideal $(x^{q})$, for q = 2, or $(y^2)$, for $q>2$. Since the center is a hypersurface the blow-up is an isomorphism.

== See also ==
- Blowing up
- Resolution of singularities
