= 2002 Czech Lion Awards =

Czech film award ceremony

10th Czech Lion Awards
- Date: March 3, 2003
- Site: Prague
- Hosted by: Jaroslav Dušek and Martin Zbrožek

Highlights
- Best Picture: Year of the Devil
- Most awards: Year of the Devil (6)
- Most nominations: Year of the Devil (10)

Television coverage
- Network: Česká televize

2002 Czech Lion Awards ceremony was held on 2 March 2003.

== Winners and nominees ==
Best Film	Best Director
Year of the Devil	Petr Zelenka — Year of the Devil
Best Actor in a Leading Role	Best Actress in a Leading Role
Ivan Trojan — The Brats	Iva Janžurová — Some Secrets
Best Actor in a Supporting Role	Best Actress in a Supporting Role
Ivan Trojan — Seducer	Jana Hubinská — Girlie
Best Screenplay	Best Editing
Some Secrets — Alice Nellis	Year of the Devil — David Charap
Design	Best Cinematography
Fimfarum — Martin Velíšek, Petr Poš	Angelic Face — Jaroslav Brabec
Music	Sound
Year of the Devil — Jaromír Nohavica, Karel Holas	Year of the Devil — Michal Holubec
Unique Contribution to Czech Film
Juraj Jakubisko

=== Non-statutory Awards ===
Best Foreign Film	Most Popular Film
Talk to Her	Year of the Devil
Worst Film	Cinema Readers' Award
Czech Waterloo	The Lord of the Rings: The Fellowship of the Ring
Film Critics' Award	Best Film Poster
Some Secrets	Josef Jelínek — Year of the Devil
