= A Beautiful Mind (book) =

1998 biography of John Nash

- Front cover
- Author: Sylvia Nasar
- Original title: A Beautiful Mind: a Biography of John Forbes Nash, Jr., Winner of the Nobel Prize in Economics, 1994
- Language: English
- Subject: John Forbes Nash Jr.
- Genre: Biography
- Published: 1998 (Simon & Schuster)
- Publication place: United States
- Media type: Print (Hardcover, paperback)
- Pages: 460
- ISBN: 0-684-81906-6
- OCLC: 38377745
- Dewey Decimal: 510/.92 B 21
- LC Class: QA29.N25 N37 1998

A Beautiful Mind is a 1998 unauthorized biography of Nobel Prize-winning economist and mathematician John Nash by Sylvia Nasar, professor of journalism at Columbia University Graduate School of Journalism.

The book won the National Book Critics Circle Award in 1998 and was nominated for the Pulitzer Prize in biography. However, A Beautiful Mind has been criticized for factual errors and uncritical reliance on interview sources. This was later adapted into the film A Beautiful Mind in 2001 directed by Ron Howard and starring Russell Crowe as Nash.

== Scope ==
Starting with his childhood, the book covers Nash's years at Princeton and MIT, his work for the RAND Corporation, his family and his struggle with schizophrenia.

Although Nasar notes that Nash did not consider himself a homosexual, she describes his arrest for indecent exposure and firing from RAND amid the suspicion that he was; at the time, it was considered grounds for revoking one's security clearance.

The book ends with Nash being awarded the Nobel Prize in Economics in 1994. The book is a detailed description of many aspects of Nash's life, including the nature of his mathematical genius, and a close examination of his personality and motivations.

== Reception ==
The book won the 1998 National Book Critics Circle Award for biography, was a finalist for the Pulitzer Prize for biography, and was shortlisted for the Rhône-Poulenc Prize in 1999. The book also appeared on The New York Times Bestseller List for biography.

== Criticism ==
John Milnor described the book as "a drastic violation of the privacy of its subject", noting the ethical issues posed by an unauthorized biography prepared without the cooperation of Nash himself. While acknowledging Nasar's extensive research, Milnor observed that "mathematical statements and proper names are sometimes a bit garbled".

Game theorist Martin J. Osborne published a detailed critique noting "many errors and oddities", including misattributions, exaggerated anecdotes, and quotations presented without proper context. Osborne criticized Nasar's tendency to uncritically transmit material from interviews, contrasting her presentation of John von Neumann anecdotes with more careful treatments by other biographers. He also identified errors in the book's explanations of game theory concepts.

== Adaptation ==
The book inspired the film A Beautiful Mind, directed by Ron Howard and starring Russell Crowe and Jennifer Connelly as John Nash and his wife Alicia Nash respectively. It won numerous awards, including the Academy Award for Best Picture and Best Adapted Screenplay for 2001 at the 74th Academy Awards.
