= Sylvia Nasar =

American journalist (born 1947)

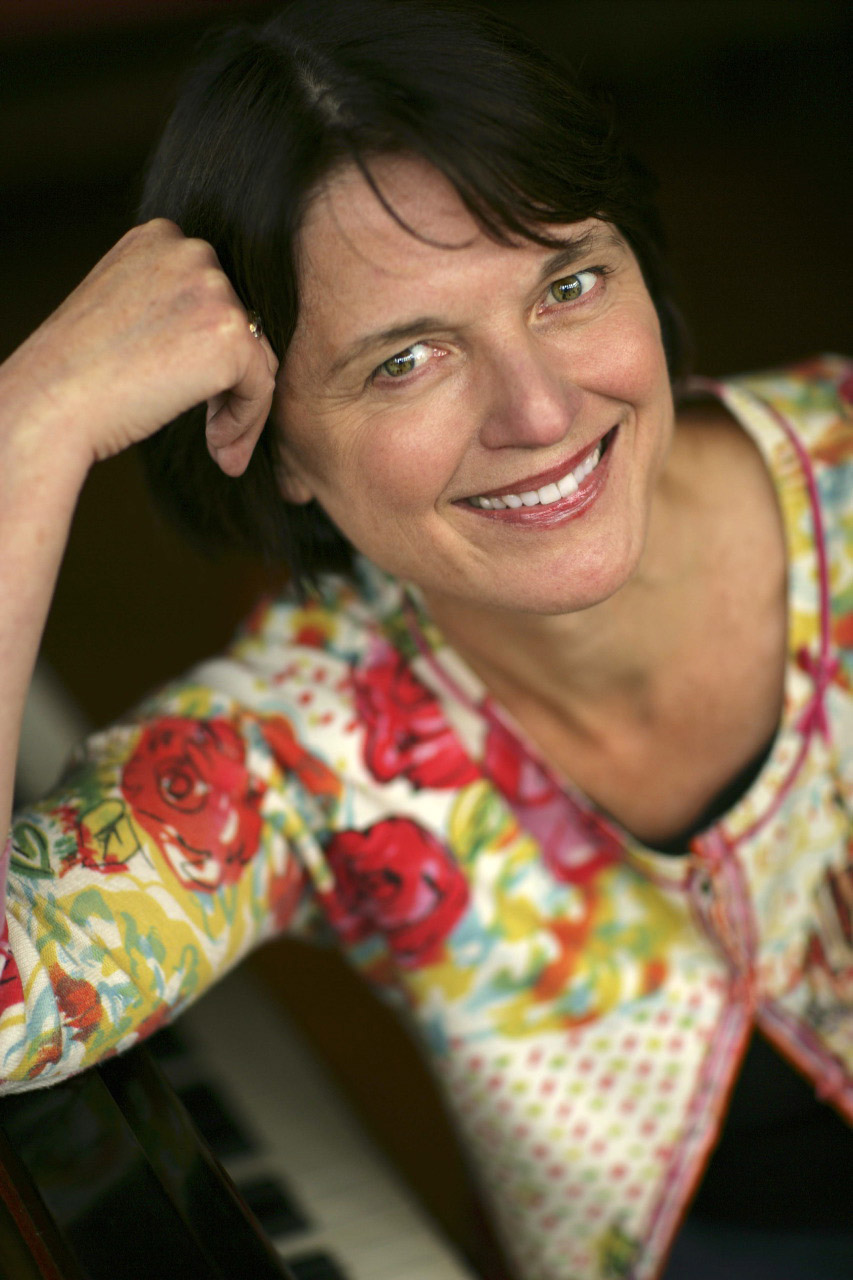
- Nasar in 2005
- Born: 17 August 1947 (age 79); Rosenheim, Allied-occupied Germany
- Occupations: Journalist; Biographer; Professor of journalism
- Writing career
- Notable work: A Beautiful Mind
- Notable awards: National Book Critics Circle Award for Biography; A Beautiful Mind (1998)

Signature
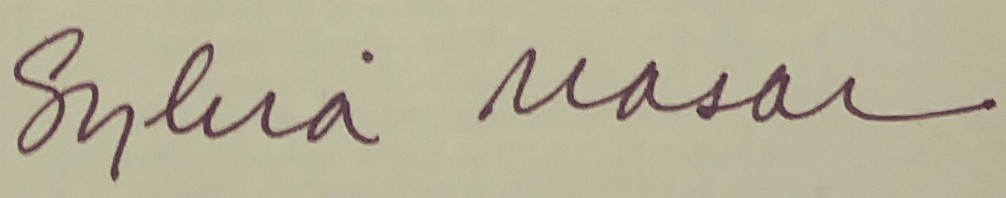

Sylvia Nasar (born 17 August 1947) is an American journalist. She is best known for her biographical book of John Forbes Nash Jr., A Beautiful Mind, for which she won the National Book Critics Circle Award for Biography. Nasar is Knight Professor Emerita at Columbia University's School of Journalism.

== Biography ==
Sylvia Nasar was born in Rosenheim, Germany, to a Bavarian mother and an Uzbek father, Rusi Nasar. Her family immigrated to the United States in 1951, then moved to Ankara, Turkey, in 1960. She graduated with a BA in literature from Antioch College in 1970 and earned a Master's degree in economics at New York University in 1976. For four years, she did research with Nobel Laureate Wassily Leontief.

She has three children, Clara, Lily and Jack, and lives in Tarrytown, New York. Her husband is Fordham University economist Darryl McLeod.

== Journalism and literary career ==
She joined Fortune magazine as a staff writer in 1983, became a columnist for U.S. News & World Report in 1990, and was an economic correspondent for the New York Times from 1991 to 1999. She was the first John S. and James L. Knight Professor of Business Journalism at Columbia University.

In March 2013, Nasar filed a lawsuit accusing the university of misdirecting $4.5 million in funds over the last decade from endowment that paid her salary. The New York Times reported, "In her suit, Ms. Nasar said that after she complained about the misspent funds, [a Columbia University official] "intimidated and harassed" her by telling her that the Knight Foundation "was dissatisfied with her performance as Knight chair because Knight objected to her work on books."

=== A Beautiful Mind ===
In 1998, Nasar published A Beautiful Mind, a biography of Nobel Prize-winning economist and mathematician John Forbes Nash Jr. The book describes many aspects Nash's life and personality and examines the stresses of severe mental illness. The book won the 1998 National Book Critics Circle Award for biography.

=== Grand Pursuit: The Story of Economic Genius ===
Nasar's second book, Grand Pursuit, was published in 2011. It is a historical narrative which sets forth Nasar's view that economics rescued mankind from squalor and deprivation by placing its material circumstances in its own hands rather than in Fate. It won the Los Angeles Times Book Prize, Science and technology.

=== "Manifold Destiny" ===
On 28 August 2006, The New Yorker published Nasar's article Manifold Destiny, which contained the only interview with Grigori Perelman, who solved the Poincaré conjecture and declined the 2006 Fields Medal. The article examined Fields Medalist Shing-Tung Yau's response to Perelman's proof. Some mathematicians wrote letters in defense of Yau over Nasar's portrayal, and Yau threatened to file a lawsuit, but no suit was filed.

== Awards and honors ==
- 2011 Los Angeles Times Book Prize (Science and technology), Grand Pursuit: The Story of Economic Genius
- 1999 Rhône-Poulenc Prize, nominated, A Beautiful Mind
- 1998 National Book Critics Circle Award for biography, A Beautiful Mind
- 1998 Pulitzer Prize for biography, nominated, A Beautiful Mind

== Works ==
- A Beautiful Mind: A Biography of John Forbes Nash Jr., Winner of the Nobel Prize in Economics, Simon & Schuster, 1998. ISBN 0-684-81906-6
- Grand Pursuit: The Story of Economic Genius, Simon & Schuster, Sept. 13, 2011. ISBN 978-0-684-87298-8
