= Malament–Hogarth spacetime =

Type of relativistic spacetime

A Malament–Hogarth (M-H) spacetime, named after David B. Malament and Mark Hogarth, is a relativistic spacetime that possesses the following property: there exists a worldline $\lambda$ and an event p such that all events along $\lambda$ are a finite interval in the past of p, but the proper time along $\lambda$ is infinite. The event p is known as an M-H event.

The boundary between events with the M-H property and events without it is a Cauchy horizon. M-H spacetimes correspond to black holes which live forever and have an inner horizon. The inner horizon is the Cauchy surface.

== Significance ==
The significance of M-H spacetimes is that they allow for the implementation of certain non-Turing computable tasks (hypercomputation). The idea is for an observer at some event in p's past to set a computer (Turing machine) to work on some task and then have the Turing machine travel on $\lambda$, computing for all eternity. Since $\lambda$ lies in p's past, the Turing machine can signal (a solution) to p at any stage of this never-ending task. Meanwhile, the observer takes a quick trip (finite proper time) through spacetime to p, to pick up the solution. The set-up can be used to decide the halting problem, which is known to be undecidable by an ordinary Turing machine. All the observer needs to do is to prime the Turing machine to signal to p if and only if the Turing machine halts.

=== Inside a black hole ===
As matter and radiation fall into a black hole, they are focused and blueshifted (their wavelengths become shorter) due to the intense gravitational field. This effect is even more pronounced near the inner horizon due to the extreme curvature of spacetime in this region.

The energy of the infalling radiation increases as it approaches the inner horizon because of this blueshifting. The energy appears to become infinite from the perspective of an observer falling into the black hole.

General relativity predicts that energy and momentum affect the curvature of spacetime. This is known as the backreaction. The blueshifted energy of the infalling radiation should, in principle, have a significant impact on the spacetime geometry near the inner horizon.

The backreaction of the blueshifted radiation leads to a runaway effect where the effective mass parameter (or energy density) of the black hole as measured near the inner horizon grows without bound. This is what is referred to as mass inflation. It results in a singularity that is not a point but rather a null, weak, or "whimper" singularity along the inner horizon.

The mass inflation singularity suggests that the inner horizon is unstable. Any small perturbation, such as an infalling particle, can lead to drastic changes in the structure of the inner horizon. This instability is a challenge for the predictability of general relativity because it could potentially lead to a breakdown of the deterministic nature of the theory.

The mass inflation scenario is a product of classical general relativity and does not take into account quantum effects, which are expected to become significant in regions of such high curvature and energy density. Quantum gravity is anticipated to provide a more complete and consistent description of what happens near and inside black holes, potentially resolving the issue of inner horizon instability and mass inflation.

== Examples ==
The Kerr metric, which describes empty spacetime around a rotating black hole, possesses these features: a computer can orbit the black hole indefinitely, while an observer falling into the black hole experiences an M-H event as they cross the inner event horizon. (This, however, neglects the effects of black hole evaporation and the infinite blueshift that is encountered at the inner horizon.)

== Bibliography ==
- Earman, John (2010). Bangs, crunches, whimpers, and shrieks: singularities and acausalities in relativistic spacetimes (PDF) (Reprinted ed.). New York, NY: Oxford Univ. Press. ISBN 978-0-19-509591-3.
- Earman, John; Norton, John D. (March 1993). "Forever is a Day: Supertasks in Pitowsky and Malament-Hogarth Spacetimes" (PDF). Philosophy of Science. 60 (1): 22–42. doi:10.1086/289716. ISSN 0031-8248.
- Earman, John; D. Norton, John (1996). "Infinite Pains: The Trouble with Supertasks" (PDF). In Morton, Adam; Stich, Stephen P. (eds.). Benacerraf and his critics. Philosophers and their critics (1. publ ed.). Oxford: Blackwell. p. 231-261. ISBN 978-0-631-19268-8.
- Hogarth, Mark L. (April 1992). "Does general relativity allow an observer to view an eternity in a finite time?". Foundations of Physics Letters. 5 (2): 173–181. Bibcode:1992FoPhL...5..173H. doi:10.1007/BF00682813. ISSN 0894-9875.
- Hogarth, Mark (1994). "Non-Turing Computers and Non-Turing Computability". PSA: Proceedings of the Biennial Meeting of the Philosophy of Science Association. 1994 (1): 126–138. doi:10.1086/psaprocbienmeetp.1994.1.193018. ISSN 0270-8647.
- Hogarth, Mark (1996). Predictability, Computability, and Spacetime (Ph.D. thesis). University of Cambridge.
- Hogarth, Mark (December 2004). "Deciding Arithmetic Using SAD Computers". The British Journal for the Philosophy of Science. 55 (4): 681–691. doi:10.1093/bjps/55.4.681. ISSN 0007-0882.
- Manchak, John Byron (March 2010). "On the Possibility of Supertasks in General Relativity" (PDF). Foundations of Physics. 40 (3): 276–288. Bibcode:2010FoPh...40..276M. doi:10.1007/s10701-009-9390-x. ISSN 0015-9018.
- P.D., Welch (2006). "The extent of computation in Malament-Hogarth spacetimes". arXiv:gr-qc/0609035.
