= Geroch's splitting theorem =

Theory of hyperbolic spacetimes

In the theory of causal structure on Lorentzian manifolds, Geroch's theorem or Geroch's splitting theorem (first proved by Robert Geroch) gives a topological characterization of globally hyperbolic spacetimes. This theorem was improved by A.N. Bernal and M. Sánchez, who proved not only the global smooth splitting but also a global Cauchy orthogonal splitting, thus neatly distinguishing a space slicing from an associated family of observers.

== Geroch’s topological theorem ==
A Cauchy surface can possess corners, and thereby need not be a differentiable submanifold of the spacetime; it is however always continuous (and even Lipschitz continuous). By using the flow of a vector field chosen to be complete, smooth, and timelike, it is elementary to prove that if a Cauchy surface S is C^{k}-smooth then the spacetime is C^{k}-diffeomorphic to the product S × R, and that any two such Cauchy surfaces are C^{k}-diffeomorphic.

Robert Geroch proved in 1970 that every globally hyperbolic spacetime has a Cauchy surface S, and that the homeomorphism (as a C^{0}-diffeomorphism) to S × R can be selected so that every surface of the form S × {a} is a Cauchy surface and each curve of the form {s} × R is a continuous timelike curve.

== The "folk" problem ==
Foundational textbooks, such as Stephen Hawking and George Ellis's The Large Scale Structure of Space-Time asserted that smoothing techniques allow Geroch's result to be strengthened from a topological to a smooth context. For this purpose, Seifert’s thesis is cited. However, the proof of this result (published as an article later) was regarded as mathematically insufficient. Indeed, Sachs and Wu coined the term folk theorem for the simplest underlying question, namely, whether a globally hyperbolic spacetime admits a smooth spacelike hypersurface. Standard books in Lorentzian Geometry either cite Sachs and Wu here or ignore Seifert’s, focusing exclusively on topological properties.

== Bernal–Sánchez smooth and orthogonal splittings ==
Bernal and Sánchez proved the existence of a smooth spacelike Cauchy hypersurface and, then, they strengthened Geroch’s topological theory to the $C^k$ category. The proof introduces an original procedure starting at Geroch’s homeomorphism and using locally defined functions type $h_p(q)=e^{-(1/d(p,q)^2)}$, where $d$ is the so-called Lorentzian distance. Such a function is smooth on convex neighborhoods and its gradient is timelike when non-vanishing. The latter property is essential to ensure the non-degeneracy of the Cauchy hypersurface, which is obtained as a regular value for a function obtained as a locally finite sum of functions $h_p$’s.

Moreover, these authors gave a splitting of globally hyperbolic spacetimes much more refined than Geroch’s topological one, which had not even been conjectured before. Specifically, Bernal–Sánchez splitting is a smooth isometry between the globally hyperbolic spacetime and the orthogonal product $\mathbb{R}\times S$, where $S$ a smooth Cauchy hypersurface. The proof relies on the construction of a Cauchy temporal function $\tau$, defined by the properties:

- (a) $\tau$ is temporal, that is, smooth with past-pointing gradient. In particular, this implies that $\tau$ is a time function, that is, it is continuous and strictly increases on future-directed causal curves, and
- (b) $\tau$ is Cauchy, that is, the slices $\tau = \text{constant}$ are Cauchy hypersurfaces.

The formal result is then the following.

Theorem. (Bernal–Sánchez splitting) Any globally hyperbolic spacetime is isometric to the smooth orthogonal product $(\mathbb{R}\times S,g)$ (where $S$ is a manifold diffeomorphic to any spacelike Cauchy hypersurface) endowed with the metric:

$$g= -\beta \, d\tau^2 + g_\tau$$

Here, the square root of the function $\beta:=1/|g(\nabla\tau, \nabla\tau)| >0$ is called the lapse, the tensor $g_\tau$ represents a Riemannian metric on each slice $\{\tau\}\times S, \tau\in \mathbb{R}$ varying smoothly with $\tau$, and the natural projection $\mathbb{R}\times S \rightarrow \mathbb{R}$, also labeled $\tau$, becomes a Cauchy temporal function.

In product coordinates $(\tau, x^i)$ of $\mathbb{R}\times S$, the metric above is written as:

$$g= -\beta(\tau, x^k) \, d\tau^2 + \sum_{i,j}g_{ij}(\tau,x^k) \, dx^i \, dx^j$$

Notice the absence of shift, that is, crossed terms $d\tau \, dx^i$, thus implying the orthogonality between the $\mathbb{R}$ and $S$ parts. H. Ringström provided detailed proofs in book format. Roughly speaking, the splitting shows that any globally hyperbolic spacetime admits a global orthogonal decomposition into "the whole space" and "everywhere time". This recovers an essential property of special relativity, where the decomposition is linear, in striking contrast to the non-linear globally hyperbolic one.

== Further consequences ==
A series of later results highlighted the subtleties inherent to the orthogonal splitting and provided further applications, among them:

1. Levels of Cauchy time functions. Bernal and Sánchez also analyzed the additional properties that can be satisfied by the spacelike slices in globally hyperbolic splittings, proving in particular:

- Any (smooth) spacelike Cauchy hypersurface $S$ can be expressed as the level $\tau=0$ for some Cauchy temporal function $\tau$ (that is, the slice $\{0\}\times S$ in the aforementioned splitting). Thus, such a splitting can be seen as a natural temporal evolution of the initial data on $S$.
- Any topological Cauchy hypersurface, even if non-smooth, can be regarded as the level $t=0$ of a smooth Cauchy time function $t$ (notice that then $t$ cannot be temporal in general). This striking property stresses the confusion when dealing with the folk problem of searching smooth time functions instead of temporal ones.

2. Time functions and stable causality. The folk problem also involved the existence of smooth functions for stably causal spacetimes and the consistency of this level. Sánchez showed that the technique in (Bernal & Sanchez 2005) can be also applied here, then proving that any stably causal spacetime admits a temporal function $\tau$. On the one hand, this proved the existence of a smooth time function in stably causal spacetimes, strengthening Hawking’s result that these spacetimes admit a (continuous) time function. On the other, the temporal function clearly remains temporal for $C^0$ close metrics, thus showing that these metrics are causal (i.e., do not admit close causal curves), that is, causality is a ($C^0$) stable property for spacetimes admitting a time function.

3. Stability of global hyperbolicity and Cauchy temporal functions. As for temporal functions, Cauchy temporal ones remain Cauchy temporal in a $C^0$ neighborhood of the original metric. In particular, this proves the $C^0$-stability of global hyperbolicity. This result appears in Geroch’s original article (1970), however, Benavides and Minguzzi (2011) critiqued Geroch’s proof and provided an alternative one without using temporal functions.

4. Lorentz Nash embeddability. The question whether a spacetime $(M,g)$ is isometrically embeddable in Lorentz–Minkowski spacetime $\mathbb{L}^N$, for some (large) dimension $N$ is natural for both the geometric viewpoint (as it connects with Nash Euclidean embeddings) and its application in string and brane theory. O. Müller and M. Sánchez noticed that, if this embedding holds, then $M$ admits a temporal function $\tau$ that additionally satisfies being steep, that is, $\tau$ fulfills $|g(\nabla \tau, \nabla\tau)| \geq 1$ (indeed, $\tau$ is given by the restriction of the natural time coordinate of $\mathbb{L}^N$ to the image of the embedding). Conversely, in the case that the metric $g$ is $C^3$, they also proved: if a spacetime admits a steep temporal function $\tau$ then it can be isometrically embedded in some $\mathbb{L}^N$. In fact, such a $\tau$ permits reducing the problem to the case of isometric embeddability of Riemannian manifolds in some Euclidean space. In particular, the celebrated Nash $C^3$ embeddability theorem can be applied then. Notice that such a $\tau$ yields a splitting as in the splitting equation with lapse $\beta \leq 1$. Moreover, Müller and Sánchez solved the problem of Lorentzian isometric and conformal embeddability in $\mathbb{L}^N$ and proved in particular:

- All globally hyperbolic spacetime admit a steep temporal function and, thus, a global Bernal–Sánchez splitting with bounded lapse.
- Any $C^3$ globally hyperbolic spacetime is isometrically embeddable in some $\mathbb{L}^N$.
- Arguments in the literature claiming the latter result were flawed because they used techniques similar to those in the old folk problem. Indeed, an explicit counterexample to these arguments was provided.

5. Invariance by isometries. Müller proved that if the globally hyperbolic metric $g$ is invariant by a compact group of isometries $G$ then the Cauchy temporal function $\tau$ (and, thus, the splitting) can be found invariant by isometries.

6. Globally hyperbolic spacetimes-with-timelike-boundary. Spacetimes with timelike boundary are smooth spacetimes $(\bar{M},g)$ defined on a manifold with boundary $\bar{M} = M \cup \partial M$, such that the boundary $\partial M$, inherits a Lorentz metric from $g$. They are called globally hyperbolic when the conditions defining global hyperbolicity (namely, causality and compactness of the diamonds $J^+(p)\cap J^-(q)$) are satisfied including the points of $\partial M$. By extending the case without boundary, Aké, Flores and Sánchez proved the equivalence between global hyperbolicity and the existence of a Cauchy hypersurface (with boundary) $\bar{S}$, which can be chosen smooth and spacelike, as well the existence of a smooth diffeomorphism between $\bar{M}$ and $\mathbb{R}\times \bar{S}$. They also proved the global orthogonal splitting still holds, however, the technique requires a highly non-trivial new ingredient. Indeed, now the required Cauchy temporal function $\tau$ must be adapted to the boundary, namely: along $\partial S$, the gradient $\nabla \tau$ must be tangent to $\partial S$. This is achieved by using a delicate argument involving the following tools:

- The double manifold (without boundary) $M^d$ obtained by identifying two copies of the original manifold $\bar{M}$ along $\partial M$.
- The stability of Cauchy temporal functions that permits to replace the original metric by other with wider cones in some steps.
- The existence of a suitably smoothened globally hyperbolic metric $g^d$ on $M^d$ invariant under the natural mirror diffeomorphism $i:M^d \rightarrow M^d$ (that interchanges the points of the double manifold).
- The results in the case without boundary, which permit finding a Cauchy temporal function $\tau^d$ for $g^d$ invariant by $i$ (thus satisfying that $\nabla \tau^d$ is tangent to $\partial M$).

Using these ingredients, the restriction of $\tau^d$ to the original $\bar{M}$ will be the required adapted function. Such a splitting becomes applicable to spacetimes with timelike conformal boundary at infinity, as (asymptotically) anti de Sitter ones, thus in the AdS/CFT correspondence.
