= Shock singularity =

Null singularity inside black holes

This animation shows the explosive merging of two neutron stars, immediately followed by the eruption of powerful jets.

In general relativity, the shock singularity, also called the shockwave singularity, the Marolf-Ori singularity, or the outflying singularity, is a null singularity propagating out of the outgoing section of the inner horizon of a spinning or charged black hole that effectively manifests as a gravitational shockwave. Perturbations to the inner horizon result in abrupt changes in the amplitude of perturbing fields and the metric tensor itself, manifesting as an effective shockwave for sufficiently late-infall observers (v_{eh}⪆15-20). The singularity was first described in 2012 by Donald Marolf and Amos Ori for classical Reissner-Nordström and Kerr black holes. It was numerically confirmed for the spherical charged case in 2016 by Ehud Eilon and Amos Ori.

== Properties ==
The shock singularity is manifested by a sudden discontinuity in the metric tensor, caused by the capture of perturbations by previously in-falling radiation scattered outward by spacetime curvature. An object encountering the singularity would undergo a sudden, dimensionless tidal deformation followed by rapid acceleration to relativistic velocities towards the center of the black hole. The deformation could also be oscillatory. Some infallers may also experience a BKL-type singularity.

The shock sharpens exponentially for later infall times. Although the shockwave is only truly experienced by late-infall observers, early-infall observers still experience shock-like behavior. This shock sharpening still appears in more realistic black hole models that take into account the black hole's accretion of dust and radiation; the shock in fact sharpens even more rapidly in these cases.

=== Differences from the mass-inflation singularity ===
The shock singularity and the mass-inflation singularity are, in some ways, morphologically similar—they are both null singularities caused by the capture of perturbations and evolve along a spinning or charged black hole's inner horizon. However, although the mass-inflation singularity is deformationally weak, the shock singularity is necessarily strong: perturbations will always grow to at least order 1 before a late-infall observer can cross the Cauchy horizon, so the shockwave must necessarily have an amplitude of at least order 1. Additionally, the amount of deformation by the mass-inflation singularity decreases as v_{eh} increases; the shock singularity has no such decrease. Rather, although the amplitude of the shockwave approaches a limiting factor, the wavelength decreases exponentially as v_{eh} becomes large.

== Future research concerns ==
Most astrophysical black holes are expected to be Kerr, but as of 2017, no numerical verification of the shock singularity in Kerr spacetime has been published. The current research on the shock singularity is also completely classical and does not take into account the possible impact of quantum gravity. Furthermore, the existence of a possible null, non-naked $r=0$ singularity is yet to be studied in-depth.

== In popular culture ==
The shock singularity is depicted in the 2014 sci-fi adventure film Interstellar. The protagonist, Cooper (Matthew McConaughey), has his spaceship The Ranger torn apart by tidal distortions of the shock singularity. The robot TARS (voiced by Bill Irwin) also collects quantum gravity data from the singularity.
