= Horizon of predictability =

A horizon of predictability is the point after which a dynamical system becomes unpredictable given initial conditions. This includes

- Cauchy horizon
- Lyapunov exponent
- Lyapunov time

== See also ==
- Butterfly effect
