= Pushforward =

The notion of pushforward in mathematics is "dual" to the notion of pullback, and can mean a number of different but closely related things.

- Pushforward (differential), the differential of a smooth map between manifolds, and the "pushforward" operations it defines
- Pushforward (homology), the map induced in homology by a continuous map between topological spaces
- Pushforward measure, measure induced on the target measure space by a measurable function
- Pushout (category theory), the categorical dual of pullback
- Direct image sheaf, the pushforward of a sheaf by a map
- Fiberwise integral, the direct image of a differential form or cohomology by a smooth map, defined by "integration on the fibres"
- Transfer operator, the pushforward on the space of measurable functions; its adjoint, the pull-back, is the composition or Koopman operator
