= Globally hyperbolic spacetime =

Spacetime manifold

In mathematical physics, global hyperbolicity is a certain condition on the causal structure of a spacetime manifold (that is, a Lorentzian manifold). It is called hyperbolic in analogy with the linear theory of wave propagation, where the future state of a system is specified by initial conditions. (In turn, the leading symbol of the wave operator is that of a hyperboloid.) This is relevant to Albert Einstein's theory of general relativity, and potentially to other metric gravitational theories.

== Overview ==
Global hyperbolicity comprises two basic physical restrictions on the Lorentzian manifold that models spacetime, both associated with physical predictability and philosophical determinism:

=== (a) Absence of closed time travel ===
This condition prevents traveling to the past, which would otherwise lead to the temporal paradox. While various causality conditions exist to forbid this, classical textbooks—such as Hawking and Ellis (1973), Wald (1984), and O'Neill (1983)—traditionally required the condition of strong causality. However, following a result by Bernal and Sánchez (2007), the simpler condition of causality is now used in the definition. This condition states that no closed causal curves exist, thus forbidding matter or energy from traveling into its own past.

=== (b) Absence of naked singularities ===
A naked singularity is a hypothetical physical phenomenon where the sudden appearance or disappearance of energy (or matter) can be recorded by observers. In essence, a relativistic singularity implies that energy may emerge from or vanish from the classical description of spacetime, as occurs in the Big Bang or the gravitational collapse of a black hole.

A singularity is called naked when it can be "seen" between two causally related events $p$ and $q$. Specifically, an observer at $p$, might send signals to a sequence $\{x_m\}_m$ of events that is wandering (i.e., the sequence has no converging subsequence, meaning it eventually "escapes" the manifold, possibly carrying energy with it), yet these signals are re-sent and recorded at event $q$. Mathematically, naked singularities are forbidden when, for any pair of events $p, q$ in the spacetime, the intersection of the causal future $J^+(p)$ of $p$ and the causal past $J^-(q)$ of $q$ is compact. If this set were not compact, a non-converging sequence $\{x_m\}_m$ would exist, representing the "leakage" of information or energy described above.

== The Splitting Theorem and Predictability ==
The fundamental splitting theorem by Geroch (1970) establishes the equivalence between global hyperbolicity and the existence of a Cauchy hypersurface. Furthermore, the proof that this hypersurface can be chosen to be smooth and spacelike (Bernal and Sánchez, 2003) makes global hyperbolicity suitable for the existence of a well-posed initial value formulation for Einstein’s equations.

This is considered a natural and essential condition in General Relativity: given arbitrary initial data, there exists a unique maximal globally hyperbolic solution to Einstein's equations. Indeed, the Strong Cosmic Censorship Hypothesis proposed by Penrose posits that the universe contains no naked singularities, thus rendering it globally hyperbolic. Remarkably, globally hyperbolic spacetimes also admit the Bernal-Sánchez global orthogonal splitting, providing a robust, stable, and highly non-unique decomposition of spacetime into distinct space and time components.

== Definitions ==
There are several equivalent definitions of global hyperbolicity. Let M be a smooth connected time-oriented Lorentzian manifold without boundary. We make the following preliminary definitions:

- M is non-totally vicious if there is at least one point such that no closed timelike curve passes through it.
- M is causal if it has no closed causal curves.
- M is non-total imprisoning if no inextendible causal curve is contained in a compact set. This property implies causality.
- M is strongly causal if for every point p and any neighborhood U of p there is a causally convex neighborhood V of p contained in U, where causal convexity means that any causal curve with endpoints in V is entirely contained in V. This property implies non-total imprisonment.
- Given any point p in M, $J^+(p)$ [resp. $J^-(p)$] is the collection of points which can be reached by a future-directed [resp. past-directed] continuous causal curve starting from p.
- Given a subset S of M, the domain of dependence of S is the set of all points p in M such that every inextendible causal curve through p intersects S.
- A subset S of M is achronal if no timelike curve intersects S more than once.
- A Cauchy surface for M is a closed achronal set whose domain of dependence is M.

The following conditions are equivalent:

1. The spacetime is causal, and for every pair of points p and q in M, the space of continuous future-directed causal curves from p to q is compact in the $\mathcal{C}^0$ topology.
2. The spacetime has a Cauchy surface.
3. The spacetime is causal, and for every pair of points p and q in M, the subset $J^+(p)\cap J^-(q)$ is compact.
4. The spacetime is strongly causal and the closure of the diamonds $J^+(p)\cap J^-(q)$ is compact.

If any of these conditions are satisfied, we say M is globally hyperbolic. If M is a smooth connected time-oriented Lorentzian manifold with boundary, we say it is globally hyperbolic if its interior is globally hyperbolic.

Other equivalent characterizations of global hyperbolicity make use of the notion of Lorentzian distance $d(p,q):=\sup_\gamma l(\gamma)$ where the supremum is taken over all the $C^1$ causal curves connecting the points (by convention d=0 if there is no such curve). They are

- A strongly causal spacetime for which $d$ is finite valued for every metric choice in the conformal class of the original metric.
- A non-total imprisoning spacetime such that $d$ is continuous for every metric choice in the conformal class of the original metric.

A similar characterization in terms of the conformal class can be given for $C^3$ metrics, using Nash type isometric embeddings, namely: A spacetime admitting an isometric embedding in Lorentz-Minkowski spacetime $\mathbb{L}^N (= \mathbb{R}^N_1)$ for all the metrics in its conformal class.

Globally hyperbolic spacetimes can also be characterized in terms of the absence of timelike points in the causal boundary (as these points play the role of naked singularities) among others.

== Remarks ==
Global hyperbolicity, in the first form given above, was introduced by Leray in order to consider well-posedness of the Cauchy problem for the wave equation on the manifold. In 1970 Geroch proved the equivalence of definitions 1 and 2. Definition 3 under the assumption of strong causality instead of causality and its equivalence to the first two was given by Hawking and Ellis.

In the first definition, the condition of causality can be dropped, just by assuming the natural topology in the space of causal curves. As mentioned above, in the third definition of global hyperbolicity the condition of causality is replaced by the stronger condition of strong causality. In 2007, Bernal and Sánchez showed that the condition of strong causality can be replaced by causality. In particular, any globally hyperbolic manifold as defined in 3 is strongly causal. Later Hounnonkpe and Minguzzi proved that for quite reasonable spacetimes, more precisely those of dimension larger than three which are non-compact or non-totally vicious, the 'causal' condition can also be dropped from definition 3.

In definition 3 the set $J^{+}(p)\cap J^{-}(q)$ is required to be compact. However, Beem and Ehrlich proved that the compactness of their closure is enough, under strong causality, which was a standard hypothesis at that time. Minguzzi proposed in 2009 the definition that these closures are compact and the spacetime is non-totally imprisoning. Further properties on splittings and stability can be seen in relation to Geroch's splitting theorem.

In 2003, Bernal and Sánchez showed that any globally hyperbolic manifold M has a smooth embedded three-dimensional Cauchy surface, and furthermore that any two Cauchy surfaces for M are diffeomorphic. In particular, M is diffeomorphic to the product of a Cauchy surface with $\mathbb{R}$. It was previously well known that any Cauchy surface of a globally hyperbolic manifold is an embedded $C^{0}$ hypersurface, any two of which are homeomorphic, and such that the manifold splits topologically as the product of the Cauchy surface and $\mathbb{R}$ (Geroch, 1970). In particular, a globally hyperbolic manifold is foliated by spacelike Cauchy surfaces.

In view of the initial value formulation for Einstein's equations, global hyperbolicity is seen to be a very natural condition in the context of general relativity, in the sense that given arbitrary initial data, there is a unique maximal globally hyperbolic solution of Einstein's equations.

== Globally hyperbolic spacetimes-with-timelike-boundary ==
The addition of a timelike boundary to a spacetime is of significant interest in several physical and mathematical contexts. For instance, the boundary may represent a conformal boundary at infinity, as in the case of Anti-de Sitter (AdS) spacetime or asymptotically AdS spaces. Alternatively, it may serve as a cut-off to isolate a specific physical system within a finite region. While these structures have been addressed periodically in the literature (e.g., Solís, 2006), a systematic study of the globally hyperbolic case was conducted by Aké, Flores, and Sánchez (2021).

These authors defined a globally hyperbolic spacetime-with-timelike-boundary as a smooth Lorentz manifold with boundary $(\bar M=M\cup \partial M,g)$ such that:

1. the metric inherited by the boundary $\partial M$ is Lorentzian (i.e., $\partial M$ is timelike) and
2. the spacetime satisfies the natural properties of being causal with compact intersections $J^+(p)\cap J^-(q)$, where these conditions must be verified by using causal curves which may touch or be partially or totally contained in $\partial M$.

Globally hyperbolic spacetimes-with-timelike-boundary present global geometric properties that extend the case without boundary to the presence of naked singularities, among them:

- When the boundary $\partial M$ is not empty, then it can be identified with the naked singularities of the interior $M$. Thus, $M$ is not intrinsically globally hyperbolic; however, it is always causally continuous. Moreover, $M$ is causally simple if and only if the boundary $\partial M$ is convex in the lightlike directions.
- Global hyperbolicity is equivalent to the existence of a Cauchy hypersurface (with boundary) $\partial S$. Moreover, the Bernal-Sánchez global orthogonal splitting can be also obtained in this case.

Summing up, this definition extends the classical notion of global hyperbolicity to manifolds where "information" might reach or emerge from a boundary. In this framework, the existence of a Cauchy hypersurface $S$ is again central, but with the added requirement that $S$ must meet the boundary $\partial M$.

== See also ==
- Causality conditions
- Causal structure
- Light cone
