= Penrose–Hawking singularity theorems =

Key results in general relativity on gravitational singularities

The Penrose–Hawking singularity theorems (after Roger Penrose and Stephen Hawking) are a set of results in general relativity that attempt to answer the question of when gravitation produces singularities. The Penrose singularity theorem is a theorem in semi-Riemannian geometry and its general relativistic interpretation predicts a gravitational singularity in black hole formation. The Hawking singularity theorem is based on the Penrose theorem and it is interpreted as a gravitational singularity in the Big Bang situation. Penrose shared half of the Nobel Prize in Physics in 2020 "for the discovery that black hole formation is a robust prediction of the general theory of relativity".

== Singularity ==
A singularity in solutions of the Einstein field equations is one of three things:

- Spacelike singularities: The singularity lies in the future or past of all events within a certain region. The Big Bang singularity and the typical singularity inside a non-rotating, uncharged Schwarzschild black hole are spacelike.
- Timelike singularities: These are singularities that can be avoided by an observer because they are not necessarily in the future of all events. An observer might be able to move around a timelike singularity. These are less common in known solutions of the Einstein field equations.
- Null singularities: These singularities occur on light-like or null surfaces. An example might be found in certain types of black hole interiors, such as the Cauchy horizon of a charged (Reissner–Nordström) or rotating (Kerr) black hole.

A singularity can be either strong or weak:

- Weak singularities: A weak singularity is one where the tidal forces (which are responsible for the spaghettification in black holes) are not necessarily infinite. An observer falling into a weak singularity might not be torn apart before reaching the singularity, although the laws of physics would still break down there. The Cauchy horizon inside a charged or rotating black hole might be an example of a weak singularity.
- Strong singularities: A strong singularity is one where tidal forces become infinite. In a strong singularity, any object would be destroyed by infinite tidal forces as it approaches the singularity. The singularity at the center of a Schwarzschild black hole is an example of a strong singularity.

Space-like singularities are a feature of non-rotating uncharged black holes as described by the Schwarzschild metric, while time-like singularities are those that occur in charged or rotating black hole exact solutions. Both of them have the property of geodesic incompleteness, in which either some light-path or some particle-path cannot be extended beyond a certain proper time or affine parameter (affine parameter being the null analog of proper time).

The Penrose theorem guarantees that some sort of geodesic incompleteness occurs inside any black hole whenever matter satisfies reasonable energy conditions. The energy condition required for the black-hole singularity theorem is weak: it says that light rays are always focused together by gravity, never drawn apart, and this holds whenever the energy of matter is non-negative.

Hawking's singularity theorem is for the whole universe, and works backwards in time: it guarantees that the (classical) Big Bang has infinite density. This theorem is more restricted and only holds when matter obeys a stronger energy condition, called the strong energy condition, in which the energy is larger than the pressure. All ordinary matter, with the exception of a vacuum expectation value of a scalar field, obeys this condition. During inflation, the universe violates the dominant energy condition, and it was initially argued (e.g. by Starobinsky) that inflationary cosmologies could avoid the initial big-bang singularity. However, it has since been shown that inflationary cosmologies are still past-incomplete, and thus require physics other than inflation to describe the past boundary of the inflating region of spacetime.

== Interpretation and significance ==
In general relativity, a singularity is a place that objects or light rays can reach in a finite time where the curvature becomes infinite, or spacetime stops being a manifold. Singularities can be found in all the black-hole spacetimes, the Schwarzschild metric, the Reissner–Nordström metric, the Kerr metric and the Kerr–Newman metric, and in all cosmological solutions that do not have a scalar field energy or a cosmological constant.

One cannot predict what might come "out" of a big-bang singularity in our past, or what happens to an observer that falls "in" to a black-hole singularity in the future, so they require a modification of physical law. Before Penrose, it was conceivable that singularities only form in contrived situations. For example, in the collapse of a star to form a black hole, if the star is spinning and thus possesses some angular momentum, maybe the centrifugal force partly counteracts gravity and keeps a singularity from forming. The singularity theorems prove that this cannot happen, and that a singularity will always form once an event horizon forms.

In the collapsing star example, since all matter and energy is a source of gravitational attraction in general relativity, the additional angular momentum only pulls the star together more strongly as it contracts: the part outside the event horizon eventually settles down to a Kerr black hole (see No-hair theorem). The part inside the event horizon necessarily has a singularity somewhere. The proof is somewhat constructive – it shows that the singularity can be found by following light-rays from a surface just inside the horizon. But the proof does not say what type of singularity occurs, spacelike, timelike, null, orbifold, jump discontinuity in the metric. It only guarantees that if one follows the time-like geodesics into the future, it is impossible for the boundary of the region they form to be generated by the null geodesics from the surface. This means that the boundary must either come from nowhere or the whole future ends at some finite extension.

An interesting "philosophical" feature of general relativity is revealed by the singularity theorems. Because general relativity predicts the inevitable occurrence of singularities, the theory is not complete without a specification for what happens to matter that hits the singularity. One can extend general relativity to a unified field theory, such as the Einstein–Maxwell–Dirac system, where no such singularities occur.

== Elements of the theorems ==
In history, there is a deep connection between the curvature of a manifold and its topology. The Bonnet–Myers theorem states that a complete Riemannian manifold that has Ricci curvature everywhere greater than a certain positive constant must be compact. The condition of positive Ricci curvature is most conveniently stated in the following way: for every geodesic there is a nearby initially parallel geodesic that will bend toward it when extended, and the two will intersect at some finite length.

When two nearby parallel geodesics intersect (see conjugate point), the extension of either one is no longer the shortest path between the endpoints. The reason is that two parallel geodesic paths necessarily collide after an extension of equal length, and if one path is followed to the intersection then the other, you are connecting the endpoints by a non-geodesic path of equal length. This means that for a geodesic to be a shortest length path, it must never intersect neighboring parallel geodesics.

Starting with a small sphere and sending out parallel geodesics from the boundary, assuming that the manifold has a Ricci curvature bounded below by a positive constant, none of the geodesics are shortest paths after a while, since they all collide with a neighbor. This means that after a certain amount of extension, all potentially new points have been reached. If all points in a connected manifold are at a finite geodesic distance from a small sphere, the manifold must be compact.

Roger Penrose argued analogously in relativity. If null geodesics, the paths of light rays, are followed into the future, points in the future of the region are generated. If a point is on the boundary of the future of the region, it can only be reached by going at the speed of light, no slower, so null geodesics include the entire boundary of the proper future of a region. When the null geodesics intersect, they are no longer on the boundary of the future, they are in the interior of the future. So, if all the null geodesics collide, there is no boundary to the future.

In relativity, the Ricci curvature, which determines the collision properties of geodesics, is determined by the energy tensor, and its projection on light rays is equal to the null-projection of the energy–momentum tensor and is always non-negative. This implies that the volume of a congruence of parallel null geodesics once it starts decreasing, will reach zero in a finite time. Once the volume is zero, there is a collapse in some direction, so every geodesic intersects some neighbor.

Penrose concluded that whenever there is a sphere where all the outgoing (and ingoing) light rays are initially converging, the boundary of the future of that region will end after a finite extension, because all the null geodesics will converge. This is significant, because the outgoing light rays for any sphere inside the horizon of a black hole solution are all converging, so the boundary of the future of this region is either compact or comes from nowhere. The future of the interior either ends after a finite extension, or has a boundary that is eventually generated by new light rays that cannot be traced back to the original sphere.

== Nature of a singularity ==
The singularity theorems use the notion of geodesic incompleteness as a stand-in for the presence of infinite curvatures. Geodesic incompleteness is the notion that there are geodesics, paths of observers through spacetime, that can only be extended for a finite time as measured by an observer traveling along one. Presumably, at the end of the geodesic the observer has fallen into a singularity or encountered some other pathology at which the laws of general relativity break down.

=== Assumptions of the theorems ===
Typically a singularity theorem has three ingredients:

1. An energy condition on the matter,
2. A condition on the global structure of spacetime,
3. Gravity is strong enough (somewhere) to trap a region.

There are various possibilities for each ingredient, and each leads to different singularity theorems.

=== Tools employed ===
A key tool used in the formulation and proof of the singularity theorems is the Raychaudhuri equation, which describes the divergence $\theta$ of a congruence (family) of geodesics. The divergence of a congruence is defined as the derivative of the log of the determinant of the congruence volume. The Raychaudhuri equation is

$$\dot{\theta} = - \sigma_{ab}\sigma^{ab} - \frac{1}{3}\theta^2 - {E[\vec{X}]^a}_a$$

where $\sigma_{ab}$ is the shear tensor of the congruence and ${E[\vec{X}]^a}_{a} = R_{mn} \, X^m \, X^n$ is also known as the Raychaudhuri scalar (see the congruence page for details). The key point is that ${E[\vec{X}]^a}_a$ will be non-negative provided that the Einstein field equations hold and

- the null energy condition holds and the geodesic congruence is null, or
- the strong energy condition holds and the geodesic congruence is timelike.

When these hold, the divergence becomes infinite at some finite value of the affine parameter. Thus all geodesics leaving a point will eventually reconverge after a finite time, provided the appropriate energy condition holds, a result also known as the focusing theorem.

This is relevant for singularities thanks to the following argument:

1. Suppose we have a spacetime that is globally hyperbolic, and two points $p$ and $q$ that can be connected by a timelike or null curve. Then there exists a geodesic of maximal length connecting $p$ and $q$. Call this geodesic $\gamma$.
2. The geodesic $\gamma$ can be varied to a longer curve if another geodesic from $p$ intersects $\gamma$ at another point, called a conjugate point.
3. From the focusing theorem, we know that all geodesics from $p$ have conjugate points at finite values of the affine parameter. In particular, this is true for the geodesic of maximal length. But this is a contradiction – one can therefore conclude that the spacetime is geodesically incomplete.

In general relativity, there are several versions of the Penrose–Hawking singularity theorem. Most versions state, roughly, that if there is a trapped null surface and the energy density is nonnegative, then there exist geodesics of finite length that cannot be extended.

These theorems, strictly speaking, prove that there is at least one non-spacelike geodesic that is only finitely extendible into the past but there are cases in which the conditions of these theorems obtain in such a way that all past-directed spacetime paths terminate at a singularity.

=== Versions ===
There are many versions; below is the null version:

Assume

1. The null energy condition holds.
2. We have a noncompact connected Cauchy surface.
3. We have a closed trapped null surface $\mathcal{T}$.

Then the spacetime has incomplete null geodesics.

Sketch of proof: Proof by contradiction. The boundary of the future of $\mathcal{T}$, $\dot{J}(\mathcal{T})$ is generated by null geodesic segments originating from $\mathcal{T}$ with tangent vectors orthogonal to it. Being a trapped null surface, by the null Raychaudhuri equation, both families of null rays emanating from $\mathcal{T}$ will encounter caustics. (A caustic by itself is unproblematic. For instance, the boundary of the future of two spacelike separated points is the union of two future light cones with the interior parts of the intersection removed. Caustics occur where the light cones intersect, but no singularity lies there.) The null geodesics generating $\dot{J}(\mathcal{T})$ have to terminate, however, i.e. reach their future endpoints at or before the caustics. Otherwise, we can take two null geodesic segments – changing at the caustic – and then deform them slightly to get a timelike curve connecting a point on the boundary to a point on $\mathcal{T}$, a contradiction. But as $\mathcal{T}$ is compact, given a continuous affine parameterization of the geodesic generators, there exists a lower bound to the absolute value of the expansion parameter. So, we know caustics will develop for every generator before a uniform bound in the affine parameter has elapsed. As a result, $\dot{J}(\mathcal{T})$ has to be compact. We can construct a congruence by timelike curves, and every single one of them has to intersect the noncompact Cauchy surface exactly once. Consider all such timelike curves passing through $\dot{J}(\mathcal{T})$ and look at their image on the Cauchy surface. Being a continuous map, the image also has to be compact. Being a timelike congruence, the timelike curves can't intersect, and so, the map is injective. If the Cauchy surface were noncompact, then the image has a boundary. We're assuming spacetime comes in one connected piece. But $\dot{J}(\mathcal{T})$ is compact and boundaryless because the boundary of a boundary is empty. A continuous injective map can't create a boundary, giving us our contradiction.

Other versions of the theorem involving the weak or strong energy condition also exist.

=== Modified gravity ===
In modified gravity, the Einstein field equations do not hold and so these singularities do not necessarily arise. For example, in Infinite Derivative Gravity, it is possible for ${E[\vec{X}]^a}_a$ to be negative even if the Null Energy Condition holds.
