= MGHD =

MGHD can refer to:

- University of Global Health Equity's academic programme Master of Science in Global Health Delivery
- Major-General commanding the Household Division
- Maximal globally hyperbolic development, relevant in initial value formulation (general relativity)
