= Nash's theorem =

In mathematics, Nash's theorem may refer to one of the following:

- the Nash embedding theorems in differential geometry
- Nash's theorem on the existence of Nash equilibria in game theory
