= Geometrodynamics =

Attempt to describe spacetime and associated phenomena in terms of geometry

In theoretical physics, geometrodynamics is an attempt to describe spacetime and associated phenomena completely in terms of geometry. Technically, its goal is to unify the fundamental forces and reformulate general relativity as a configuration space of three-metrics, modulo three-dimensional diffeomorphisms. The origin of this idea can be found in an English mathematician William Kingdon Clifford's works. This theory was enthusiastically promoted by John Wheeler in the 1960s, and work on it continues in the 21st century.

== Einstein's geometrodynamics ==
The term geometrodynamics is used as a synonym for general relativity. More properly, some authors use the phrase Einstein's geometrodynamics to denote the initial value formulation of general relativity, introduced by Arnowitt, Deser, and Misner (ADM formalism) around 1960. In this reformulation, spacetimes are sliced up into spatial hyperslices in a rather arbitrary fashion, and the vacuum Einstein field equation is reformulated as an evolution equation describing how, given the geometry of an initial hyperslice (the "initial value"), the geometry evolves over "time". This requires giving constraint equations which must be satisfied by the original hyperslice. It also involves some "choice of gauge"; specifically, choices about how the coordinate system used to describe the hyperslice geometry evolves.

== Wheeler's geometrodynamics ==
Wheeler wanted to reduce physics to geometry in an even more fundamental way than the ADM reformulation of general relativity with a dynamic geometry whose curvature changes with time. It attempts to realize three concepts:

- mass without mass
- charge without charge
- field without field

He wanted to lay the foundation for quantum gravity and unify gravitation with electromagnetism (the strong and weak interactions were not yet sufficiently well understood in 1960 to be included).

Wheeler introduced the notion of geons, gravitational wave packets confined to a compact region of spacetime and held together by the gravitational attraction of the (gravitational) field energy of the wave itself. Wheeler was intrigued by the possibility that geons could affect test particles much like a massive object, hence mass without mass.

Wheeler was also much intrigued by the fact that the (nonspinning) point-mass solution of general relativity, the Schwarzschild vacuum, has the nature of a wormhole. Similarly, in the case of a charged particle, the geometry of the Reissner–Nordström electrovacuum solution suggests that the symmetry between electric (which "end" in charges) and magnetic field lines (which never end) could be restored if the electric field lines do not actually end but only go through a wormhole to some distant location or even another branch of the universe. George Rainich had shown decades earlier that one can obtain the electromagnetic field tensor from the electromagnetic contribution to the stress–energy tensor, which in general relativity is directly coupled to spacetime curvature; Wheeler and Misner developed this into the so-called already-unified field theory which partially unifies gravitation and electromagnetism, yielding charge without charge.

In the ADM reformulation of general relativity, Wheeler argued that the full Einstein field equation can be recovered once the momentum constraint can be derived, and suggested that this might follow from geometrical considerations alone, making general relativity something like a logical necessity. Specifically, curvature (the gravitational field) might arise as a kind of "averaging" over very complicated topological phenomena at very small scales, the so-called spacetime foam. This would realize geometrical intuition suggested by quantum gravity, or field without field.

These ideas captured the imagination of many physicists, even though Wheeler himself quickly dashed some of the early hopes for his program. In particular, spin 1/2 fermions proved difficult to handle. For this, one has to go to the Einsteinian Unified Field Theory of the Einstein–Maxwell–Dirac system, or more generally, the Einstein–Yang–Mills-Dirac-Higgs System.

Geometrodynamics also attracted attention from philosophers intrigued by the possibility of realizing some of Descartes' and Spinoza's ideas about the nature of space.

== Modern notions of geometrodynamics ==
More recently, Christopher Isham, Jeremy Butterfield, and their students have continued to develop quantum geometrodynamics to take account of recent work toward a quantum theory of gravity and further developments in the very extensive mathematical theory of initial value formulations of general relativity. Some of Wheeler's original goals remain important for this work, particularly the hope of laying a solid foundation for quantum gravity. The philosophical program also continues to motivate several prominent contributors.

Topological ideas in the realm of gravity date back to Riemann, Clifford, and Weyl and found a more concrete realization in the wormholes of Wheeler characterized by the Euler-Poincaré invariant. They result from attaching handles to black holes.

Observationally, Albert Einstein's general relativity (GR) is rather well established for the Solar System and double pulsars. However, in GR the metric plays a double role: Measuring distances in spacetime and serving as a gravitational potential for the Christoffel connection. This dichotomy seems to be one of the main obstacles for quantizing gravity. Arthur Stanley Eddington suggested already in 1924 in his book The Mathematical Theory of Relativity (2nd Edition) to regard the connection as the basic field and the metric merely as a derived concept.

Consequently, the primordial action in four dimensions should be constructed from a metric-free topological action such as the Pontryagin invariant of the corresponding gauge connection. Similarly as in the Yang–Mills theory, a quantization can be achieved by amending the definition of curvature and the Bianchi identities via topological ghosts. In such a graded Cartan formalism, the nilpotency of the ghost operators is on par with the Poincaré lemma for the exterior derivative. Using a BRST antifield formalism with a duality gauge fixing, a consistent quantization in spaces of double dual curvature is obtained. The constraint imposes instanton type solutions on the curvature-squared 'Yang-Mielke theory' of gravity, proposed in its affine form already by Weyl 1919 and by Yang in 1974. However, these exact solutions exhibit a 'vacuum degeneracy'. One needs to modify the double duality of the curvature via scale breaking terms, in order to retain Einstein's equations with an induced cosmological constant of partially topological origin as the unique macroscopic 'background'.

Such scale breaking terms arise more naturally in a constraint formalism, the so-called BF scheme, in which the gauge curvature is denoted by F. In the case of gravity, it departs from the special linear group SL(5, R) in four dimensions, thus generalizing (Anti-)de Sitter gauge theories of gravity. After applying spontaneous symmetry breaking to the corresponding topological BF theory, again Einstein spaces emerge with a tiny cosmological constant related to the scale of symmetry breaking. Here the 'background' metric is induced via a Higgs-like mechanism. The finiteness of such a deformed topological scheme may convert into asymptotic safeness after quantization of the spontaneously broken model.

The concepts of geometrodynamics have motivated work to use the Kerr-Newman metric to create a relativistic but non-quantum model for the electron.

== See also ==
- Mathematics of general relativity
- Hamilton–Jacobi–Einstein equation (HJEE)
- Numerical relativity
- Black hole electron
- Teleparallelism
