= Pullback =

Process in mathematics

In mathematics, a pullback is either of two related processes: precomposition and fiber-product; precomposition is a special case of the general fiber-product. Its dual is a pushforward.

== Precomposition ==
Precomposition with a function probably provides the most elementary notion of pullback: in simple terms, a function $f$ of a variable $y,$ where $y$ itself is a function of another variable $x,$ may be written as a function of $x.$ This is the pullback of $f$ by the function $y.$
$$f(y(x)) \equiv g(x)$$
It is such a fundamental process that it is often passed over without mention.

However, it is not just functions that can be "pulled back" in this sense. Pullbacks can be applied to many other objects such as differential forms and their cohomology classes; see

- Pullback (differential geometry)
- Pullback (cohomology)

== Fiber-product ==
The pullback bundle is an example that bridges the notion of a pullback as precomposition, and the notion of a pullback as a Cartesian square. In that example, the base space of a fiber bundle is pulled back, in the sense of precomposition, above. The fibers then travel along with the points in the base space at which they are anchored: the resulting new pullback bundle looks locally like a Cartesian product of the new base space, and the (unchanged) fiber. The pullback bundle then has two projections: one to the base space, the other to the fiber; the product of the two becomes coherent when treated as a fiber product.

=== Generalizations and category theory ===
The notion of pullback as a fiber-product ultimately leads to the very general idea of a categorical pullback, but it has important special cases: inverse image (and pullback) sheaves in algebraic geometry, and pullback bundle in algebraic topology and differential geometry.

== Functional analysis ==
When the pullback is studied as an operator acting on function spaces, it becomes a linear operator, and is known as the transpose or composition operator. Its adjoint is the push-forward, or, in the context of functional analysis, the transfer operator.

== Relationship ==
The relation between the two notions of pullback can perhaps best be illustrated by sections of fiber bundles: if $s$ is a section of a fiber bundle $E$ over $N,$ and $f : M \to N,$ then the pullback (precomposition) $f^* s = s\circ f$ of s with $f$ is a section of the pullback (fiber-product) bundle $f^*E$ over $M.$

== See also ==
- Inverse image functor – Construction in algebraic topology
- Pullback (category theory)
- Fibred category
- Inverse image sheaf
