= Mass inflation =

Phenomenon within general relativity

In general relativity, mass inflation or mass blow-up is a phenomenon inside spinning or charged black holes in which the interactions of outgoing and ingoing radiation at the Cauchy horizon cause the internal gravitational mass parameter of the black hole to become unbounded at the Cauchy horizon. It also predicts the existence of a weak null singularity at the Cauchy horizon of a spinning or charged black hole. Mass inflation was confirmed numerically for a spherical charged black hole by Lior Burko in 1997 and for an uncharged rotating black hole by Mihalis Dafermos and Jonathan Luk in 2017.

== Divergence of the gravitational mass parameter ==
In a collapsing star, gravitational radiation is emitted, carrying away information about all the initial characteristics of the initial star other than its mass, charge, and spin as per the no-hair theorem. Some of the radiation escapes to infinity, while some is backscattered by spacetime curvature and reabsorbed by the newly-formed black hole. Mass inflation occurs because as the gravitational radiation approaches the Cauchy horizon, a region of infinite blueshift, it too suffers from ever-increasing blueshift and its energy density increases without bound.

If one does not consider perturbations by the collapsing star within the inner horizon, the buildup of this gravitational radiation would have no effect: the Cauchy horizon, a region of infinite blueshift for observers outside the horizon, and the apparent inner horizon, a region of infinite redshift for observers inside the horizon, would effectively "cancel out" and no mass inflation would occur. But as outgoing radiation from the collapsing star crosses the inner horizon, the Cauchy horizon and apparent horizon separate, stopping the cancellation from occurring and allowing mass-inflation to take place. These ingoing and outgoing streams of radiation and the energy flux of blueshifting radiation increase the gravitational force, which further accelerates the streams, which then increases the gravitational force and so on, creating a positive feedback loop that leads to runaway growth of the gravitational mass parameter (also called the internal mass function).

For a realistic astrophysical black hole in classical (non-quantum) general relativity, this mass inflation is caused only by accretion within the last few hundred black hole crossing times (rather than the distant past or far future). Counterintuitively, the accretion rate of the black hole is inversely proportional to the rate of exponentiation of the mass function, unless the accretion rate is near the maximum.

== Mass-inflation singularity ==
The divergence of the gravitational mass parameter has interesting local consequences for an extended infalling object: since the mass parameter determines the Coulomb component of the local curvature inside a black hole, an increase in the parameter would lead to increased tidal forces felt locally by the object. This results in a curvature singularity at the Cauchy horizon known as the mass-inflation singularity, the Cauchy horizon singularity, the infalling singularity, or the "fat cigar" singularity. In 1991, Amos Ori confirmed that the singularity was deformationally weak: although an object would experience infinite tidal forces at the singularity, tidal distortion on an object in all three spatial dimensions would still be finite, implying that a macroscopic object would not be crushed. In 1997, Lior Burko verified numerically that, for a Reissner-Nordstrom black hole, the entire null singularity is weak. Analysis of a more realistic gravitational collapse scenario by Hod and Piran strengthened Burko's findings, verifying numerically that mass inflation still occurs in the gravitational collapse of a spherical charged black hole with realistic initial parameters, and the resulting singularity is still weak and null. In 2016, Burko, Khanna, and Zenginoǧlu discovered that the rate at which curvature increases near the Cauchy horizon was far lower than had previously been found via perturbative analysis.

On the other hand, Hamilton and Avelino contend the idea that a realistic astrophysical black hole would not have a weak null singularity at the Cauchy horizon, arguing that the proposed singularity would not be able to exist if anything fell in. Even if the black hole remained isolated forever, pair creation near the inner horizon would prevent a weak null singularity from forming. Instead, the result of mass inflation would be a central, spacelike, BKL-type singularity.

== Impact of quantum effects ==
Scientists differ on the extent of the impact of quantum effects on mass inflation. Some scientists, including Poisson and Israel themselves, have suggested that, even incorporating quantum effects, the mass-inflation singularity would likely still exist. Hamilton and Avelino argue, however, that mass inflation is majorly impacted by quantum gravity, and that an observer's demise in a sufficiently large black hole (as so not to spaghettify them before they reach the Cauchy horizon) would be caused by super-Planckian curvature, not by a null singularity at the Cauchy horizon.

If mass inflation does exist despite the interactions of quantum gravity, it would likely be different than what is predicted by general relativity. For one, the stress-energy tensor also diverges faster quantum mechanically than classically, which Poisson and Balbinot theorized could in turn influence the mass function. The existence of the Higgs field also affects the dynamics of mass-inflation: in a black hole without a Higgs field, mass inflation would consist of cycles of exponential growth, whereas in a black hole with a Higgs field no such cycles would occur and the mass function would grow monotonously.

== Further implications ==
=== Non-determinism beyond the Cauchy horizon ===
After Roger Penrose pointed out in the 1960s that the Cauchy horizon of a black hole is a region of infinite blueshift and a barrier in which causality breaks down, the inherent non-predictability of spacetime beyond the horizon puzzled scientists for decades. This was especially problematic as it violated the classical view of determinism. It became the basis of Roger Penrose's 1979 strong cosmic censorship conjecture, in which he argued that the Cauchy horizon could not exist because any perturbations by passing gravitational waves would cause the horizon to collapse into a strong, spacelike singularity. However, the conjecture was proven false in 2018 by mathematicians Mihalis Dafermos and Jonathan Luk, who mathematically confirmed the existence of the singularity in Kerr spacetime. Despite this, the mathematicians discovered that the existence of a weak null singularity at the Cauchy horizon would prevent the existence of multiple solutions of Einstein's equations beyond the Cauchy horizon, thus saving determinism. They instead theorized that spacetime beyond the Cauchy horizon is not smooth enough to use Einstein's equations at all.

=== Wormholes ===
Research has suggested that the central singularity in Reissner-Nordstrom and Kerr black holes is timelike, potentially allowing infalling matter to avoid the singularity altogether and "tunnel" into another universe. However, the existence of a singularity at the Cauchy horizon suggests that such a "Kerr tunnel" would be closed off, preventing any infallers from using it as a wormhole. If the singularity were to be resolved by the effects of quantum gravity, though, a wormhole leading out into a white hole could still exist inside a black hole's core.
