= Pushforward (homology) =

In algebraic topology, the pushforward of a continuous function $f$ : $X \rightarrow Y$ between two topological spaces is a homomorphism $f_{*}:H_n\left(X\right) \rightarrow H_n\left(Y\right)$ between the homology groups for $n \geq 0$.

Homology is a functor which converts a topological space $X$ into a sequence of homology groups $H_{n}\left(X\right)$. (Often, the collection of all such groups is referred to using the notation $H_{*}\left(X\right)$; this collection has the structure of a graded ring.) In any category, a functor must induce a corresponding morphism. The pushforward is the morphism corresponding to the homology functor.

== Definition for singular and simplicial homology ==
We build the pushforward homomorphism as follows (for singular or simplicial homology):

First, the map $f\colon X\to Y$ induces a homomorphism between the singular or simplicial chain complex $C_n\left(X\right)$ and $C_n\left(Y\right)$ defined by composing each singular n-simplex $\sigma_X\colon\Delta^n\rightarrow X$ with $f$ to obtain a singular n-simplex of $Y$, $f_{\#}\left(\sigma_X\right) = f\sigma_X\colon\Delta^n\rightarrow Y$, and extending this linearly via $f_{\#}\left(\sum_tn_t\sigma_t\right) = \sum_tn_tf_{\#}\left(\sigma_t\right)$.

The maps $f_{\#}\colon C_n\left(X\right)\rightarrow C_n\left(Y\right)$ satisfy $f_{\#}\partial = \partial f_{\#}$ where $\partial$ is the boundary operator between chain groups, so $\partial f_{\#}$ defines a chain map.

Therefore, $f_{\#}$ takes cycles to cycles, since $\partial \alpha = 0$ implies $\partial f_{\#}\left( \alpha \right) = f_{\#}\left(\partial \alpha \right) = 0$. Also $f_{\#}$ takes boundaries to boundaries since $f_{\#}\left(\partial \beta \right) = \partial f_{\#}\left(\beta \right)$.

Hence $f_{\#}$ induces a homomorphism between the homology groups $f_{*} : H_n\left(X\right) \rightarrow H_n\left(Y\right)$ for $n\geq0$.

== Properties and homotopy invariance ==
Two basic properties of the push-forward are:

1. $\left( f\circ g\right)_{*} = f_{*}\circ g_{*}$ for the composition of maps $X\overset{g}{\rightarrow}Y\overset{f}{\rightarrow}Z$.
2. $\left( \text{id}_X \right)_{*} = \text{id}$ where $\text{id}_X$ : $X\rightarrow X$ refers to identity function of $X$ and $\text{id}\colon H_n\left(X\right) \rightarrow H_n\left(X\right)$ refers to the identity isomorphism of homology groups.

(This shows the functoriality of the pushforward.)

A main result about the push-forward is the homotopy invariance: if two maps $f,g\colon X\rightarrow Y$ are homotopic, then they induce the same homomorphism $f_{*} = g_{*}\colon H_n\left(X\right) \rightarrow H_n\left(Y\right)$.

This immediately implies (by the above properties) that the homology groups of homotopy equivalent spaces are isomorphic: The maps $f_{*}\colon H_n\left(X\right) \rightarrow H_n\left(Y\right)$ induced by a homotopy equivalence $f\colon X\rightarrow Y$ are isomorphisms for all $n$.

== See also ==
- Pullback (cohomology)
