= Cauchy problem =

Class of problems for PDEs

A Cauchy problem in mathematics asks for the solution of a partial differential equation that satisfies certain conditions that are given on a hypersurface in the domain. A Cauchy problem may involve initial or boundary values. It is named after Augustin-Louis Cauchy.

== Formal statement ==
For a partial differential equation defined on $\mathbb{R}^{n+1}$ and a smooth manifold $S \subset \mathbb{R}^{n+1}$ of dimension $n$ ($S$ is called the Cauchy surface), the Cauchy problem consists of finding the unknown functions $u_1,\dots,u_N$ of the differential equation with respect to the independent variables $t,x_1,\dots,x_n$ that satisfies
$$\begin{align}&\frac{\partial^{n_i}u_i}{\partial t^{n_i}} = F_i\left(t,x_1,\dots,x_n,u_1,\dots,u_N,\dots,\frac{\partial^k u_j}{\partial t^{k_0}\partial x_1^{k_1}\dots\partial x_n^{k_n}},\dots\right) \\
&\text{for } i,j = 1,2,\dots,N;\, k_0+k_1+\dots+k_n=k\leq n_j;\, k_0<n_j
\end{align}$$
subject to the condition, for some value $t=t_0$,

$$\frac{\partial^k u_i}{\partial t^k}=\phi_i^{(k)}(x_1,\dots,x_n)
\quad \text{for } k=0,1,2,\dots,n_i-1$$

where $\phi_i^{(k)}(x_1,\dots,x_n)$ are given functions defined on the surface $S$ (collectively known as the Cauchy data of the problem). The derivative of order zero means that the function itself is specified.

== Cauchy–Kowalevski theorem ==
The Cauchy–Kovalevskaya theorem, named in honor of Cauchy and Sofya Kovalevskaya, states: If all the functions $F_i$ are analytic in some neighborhood of the point $(t^0,x_1^0,x_2^0,\dots,\phi_{j,k_0,k_1,\dots,k_n}^0,\dots)$, and if all the functions $\phi_j^{(k)}$ are analytic in some neighborhood of the point $(x_1^0,x_2^0,\dots,x_n^0)$, then the Cauchy problem has a unique analytic solution in some neighborhood of the point $(t^0,x_1^0,x_2^0,\dots,x_n^0)$.

== See also ==
- Cauchy boundary condition
- Cauchy horizon
