= Causality conditions =

Classifications of Lorentzian manifolds

Causality conditions are classifications of Lorentzian manifolds according to the types of causal structures they admit. In the study of spacetimes, there exists a hierarchy of causality conditions which are important in proving mathematical theorems about the global structure of such manifolds. These conditions were collected during the late 1970s.

The weaker the causality condition on a spacetime, the more unphysical the spacetime is. Spacetimes with closed timelike curves, for example, present severe interpretational difficulties. See the grandfather paradox.

It is reasonable to believe that any physical spacetime will satisfy the strongest causality condition: global hyperbolicity. For such spacetimes the equations in general relativity can be posed as an initial value problem on a Cauchy surface.

== The hierarchy ==
There is a hierarchy of causality conditions, each one of which is strictly stronger than the previous. This is sometimes called the causal ladder. The conditions, from weakest to strongest, are:

- Non-totally vicious
- Chronological
- Causal
- Distinguishing
- Strongly causal
- Stably causal
- Causally continuous
- Causally simple
- Globally hyperbolic

Given are the definitions of these causality conditions for a Lorentzian manifold $(M,g)$. Where two or more are given they are equivalent.

Notation:

- $p \ll q$ denotes the chronological relation.
- $p \prec q$ denotes the causal relation.

(See causal structure for definitions of $\,I^+(x)$, $\,I^-(x)$ and $\,J^+(x)$, $\,J^-(x)$.)

== Non-totally vicious ==
- For some points $p \in M$ we have $p \not\ll p$.

== Chronological ==
- There are no closed chronological (timelike) curves.
- The chronological relation is irreflexive: $p \not\ll p$ for all $p \in M$.

== Causal ==
- There are no closed causal (non-spacelike) curves.
- If both $p \prec q$ and $q \prec p$ then $p = q$

== Distinguishing ==
=== Past-distinguishing ===
- Two points $p, q \in M$ which share the same chronological past are the same point:

$$I^-(p) = I^-(q) \implies p = q$$

- Equivalently, for any neighborhood $U$ of $p \in M$ there exists a neighborhood $V \subset U, p \in V$ such that no past-directed non-spacelike curve from $p$ intersects $V$ more than once.

=== Future-distinguishing ===
- Two points $p, q \in M$ which share the same chronological future are the same point:

$$I^+(p) = I^+(q) \implies p = q$$

- Equivalently, for any neighborhood $U$ of $p \in M$ there exists a neighborhood $V \subset U, p \in V$ such that no future-directed non-spacelike curve from $p$ intersects $V$ more than once.

A spacetime is called distinguishing when it is both future and past distinguishing, that is, when each point is determined (distinguished) by its chronological future and also by its chronological past.

== Strongly causal ==
- For every neighborhood $U$ of $p \in M$ there exists a neighborhood $V \subset U, p \in V$ through which no timelike curve passes more than once.
- For every neighborhood $U$ of $p \in M$ there exists a neighborhood $V \subset U, p \in V$ that is causally convex in $M$ (and thus in $U$), that is, for each $q, q'$ in $V$ any causal curve in $M$ from $q$ to $q'$ must be entirely contained in $U$.
- The Alexandrov topology (generated by the chronological futures and pasts of all the points) satisfies any of the following equivalent conditions:
  - (a) the Alexandrov topology is equal to the topology of the manifold.
  - (b) the Alexandrov topology is Hausdorff.

== Stably causal ==
For each of the weaker causality conditions defined above, there are some manifolds satisfying the condition which can be made to violate it by arbitrarily small perturbations of the metric. A spacetime $(M,g)$ is called stably causal if it satisfies any of the following equivalent conditions:

1. Causality is ($C^0$) stable: there exists a causal Lorentzian metric $g'$ on $M$ with the cones strictly wider than the original ones of $g$ (that is, all the causal vectors for $g$ are timelike vectors for $g'$).
2. It admits a time function: there exists a continuous function $t$ which is strictly increasing on causal (timelike or lightlike) curves.
3. It admits a temporal function: there exists a smooth function $\tau$ whose gradient $\nabla \tau$ is timelike and past directed (in particular, $\tau$ is then a time function).

Hawking (1969) proved that condition 1 implies 2, and Bernal and Sánchez (2005) proved that 2 implies 3, while it is not difficult to check that condition 3 implies 1. See Sánchez for a detailed account, as well as its relation with the folk problems of smoothability

== Causally continuous ==
A spacetime is called causally continuous when it satisfies: (a) it is distinguishing and (b) the chronological future $I^+(p)$ and past $I^-(p)$ varies continuously with the point $p$.

There are several ways to express formally the meaning of this continuity. One of them starts by regarding $I^+$ and $I^-$ as set-valued functions from the manifold $M$ into the set $\mathbb{P}(M)$ of parts of $M$ (i.e., the points of $\mathbb{P}(M)$ are the subsets of $M$). Notice that $M$ is endowed with a topology, and a topology on $\mathbb{P}(M)$ can be defined as follows. For any compact $K \subset M$, the subsets of $M$ not intersecting $K$ form a subset of $\mathbb{P}(M)$, which is defined as open, then, these open sets are a base for the required topology. Thus, the condition (b) means that the maps $I^\pm: M \rightarrow \mathbb{P}(M)$ are continuous as maps on topological spaces.

== Causally simple ==
A spacetime is called causally simple when it satisfies: (a) it is causal and (b) $J^+(p)$ and $J^-(p)$ are closed for every point.

Hawking and Ellis (1973), Beem, Ehrlich and Easley (1996) and others traditionally required the condition of strong causality. However, following a result by Bernal and Sánchez (2007), the simpler condition of causality is now used in the definition.

== Globally hyperbolic ==
- $\,M$ is causal and every set $J^+(x) \cap J^-(y)$ (for points $x,y \in M$) is compact.

Robert Geroch showed that a spacetime is globally hyperbolic if and only if there exists a Cauchy surface for $M$. This means that:

- $M$ is topologically equivalent to $\mathbb{R} \times\!\, S$ for some Cauchy surface $S.$ (Here $\mathbb{R}$ denotes the real line).

Moreover, it also admits the global orthogonal splitting obtained by Bernal and Sánchez (2005), thus showing that space and time can be globally distinguished (in a highly non-unique way).

== Properties of the hierarchy ==
It is worth pointing out that all the levels of the ladder are preserved when narrowing the cones (that is, when the original metric $g$ is replaced by a metric $g'$ whose causal vectors are included in the causal vectors for $g$), except causal continuity and causal simplicity, as shown by García-Parrado and Sánchez with an explicit counterexample.
