= Initial value formulation (general relativity) =

Reformulation of general relativity

The initial value formulation of general relativity is a reformulation of Albert Einstein's theory of general relativity that describes a universe evolving over time.

Each solution of the Einstein field equations encompasses the whole history of a universe – it is not just some snapshot of how things are, but a whole spacetime: a statement encompassing the state of matter and geometry everywhere and at every moment in that particular universe. By this token, Einstein's theory appears to be different from most other physical theories, which specify evolution equations for physical systems; if the system is in a given state at some given moment, the laws of physics allow you to extrapolate its past or future. For Einstein's equations, there appear to be subtle differences compared with other fields: they are self-interacting (that is, non-linear even in the absence of other fields); they are diffeomorphism invariant, so to obtain a unique solution, a fixed background metric and gauge conditions need to be introduced; finally, the metric determines the spacetime structure, and thus the domain of dependence for any set of initial data, so the region on which a specific solution will be defined is not, a priori, defined.

There is, however, a way to re-formulate Einstein's equations that overcomes these problems. First of all, there are ways of rewriting spacetime as the evolution of "space" in time; an earlier version of this is due to Paul Dirac, while a simpler way is known after its inventors Richard Arnowitt, Stanley Deser and Charles Misner as ADM formalism. In these formulations, also known as "3+1" approaches, spacetime is split into a three-dimensional hypersurface with interior metric and an embedding into spacetime with exterior curvature; these two quantities are the dynamical variables in a Hamiltonian formulation tracing the hypersurface's evolution over time. With such a split, it is possible to state the initial value formulation of general relativity. It involves initial data which cannot be specified arbitrarily but needs to satisfy specific constraint equations, and which is defined on some suitably smooth three-manifold $\Sigma$; just as for other differential equations, it is then possible to prove existence and uniqueness theorems, namely that there exists a unique spacetime which is a solution of Einstein equations, which is globally hyperbolic, for which $\Sigma$ is a Cauchy surface (i.e. all past events influence what happens on $\Sigma$, and all future events are influenced by what happens on it), and has the specified internal metric and extrinsic curvature; all spacetimes that satisfy these conditions are related by isometries.

The initial value formulation with its 3+1 split is the basis of numerical relativity; attempts to simulate the evolution of relativistic spacetimes (notably merging black holes or gravitational collapse) using computers. However, there are significant differences to the simulation of other physical evolution equations which make numerical relativity especially challenging, notably the fact that the dynamical objects that are evolving include space and time itself (so there is no fixed background against which to evaluate, for instance, perturbations representing gravitational waves) and the occurrence of singularities (which, when they are allowed to occur within the simulated portion of spacetime, lead to arbitrarily large numbers that would have to be represented in the computer model).

== See also ==
- ADM formalism
