= Gravitational singularity =

Condition in which spacetime itself breaks down

In theoretical physics, a gravitational singularity, spacetime singularity, or simply singularity, is a theoretical condition in which gravity is predicted to be so intense that spacetime itself would break down catastrophically. As such, a singularity is by definition no longer part of the regular spacetime and cannot be determined by where or when. No complete and precise definition of singularities exist in the theory of general relativity, the current theory of gravity. A singularity in general relativity can be defined by the scalar invariant curvature becoming infinite, or by a geodesic being incomplete.

General relativity predicts that any object collapsing beyond its Schwarzschild radius would form a black hole, inside which a singularity will form. A black hole singularity is, however, covered by an event horizon, so it is never in the causal past of any outside observer, and at no time can it be objectively said to have formed. General relativity also predicts that the initial state of the universe, at the beginning of the Big Bang, was a singularity of infinite density and temperature. However, classical gravitational theories are not expected to be accurate under these conditions, and a quantum description is likely needed. For example, quantum mechanics does not permit particles to inhabit a space smaller than their Compton wavelengths.

== Interpretation ==
Many theories in physics have mathematical singularities of one kind or another. Equations for these physical theories predict that the ball of mass of some quantity becomes infinite or increases without limit. This is generally a sign for a missing piece in the theory, as in the ultraviolet catastrophe, re-normalization, and instability of a hydrogen atom predicted by the Larmor formula.

In classical field theories, including special relativity but not general relativity, one can say that a solution has a singularity at a particular point in spacetime where certain physical properties become ill-defined, with spacetime serving as a background field to locate the singularity. A singularity in general relativity, on the other hand, is more complex because spacetime itself becomes ill-defined, and the singularity is no longer part of the regular spacetime manifold. In general relativity, a singularity cannot be defined by where or when.

Some theories, such as the theory of loop quantum gravity, suggest that singularities may not exist. This is also true for such classical unified field theories as the Einstein–Maxwell–Dirac equations. The idea can be stated in the form that, due to quantum gravity effects, there is a minimum distance beyond which the force of gravity no longer continues to increase as the distance between the masses becomes shorter, or alternatively that interpenetrating particle waves mask gravitational effects that would be felt at a distance.

== In black holes ==
Mathematical models of black holes based on general relativities have singularities at their centers—points where the curvature of spacetime becomes infinite, and geodesics terminate within a finite proper time. However, it is unknown whether these singularities truly exist in real black holes. Some physicists believe that singularities do not exist, and that their existence, which would make spacetime unpredictable, signals a breakdown of general relativity and a need for a more complete understanding of quantum gravity. Others believe that such singularities could be resolved within the current framework of physics, without having to introduce quantum gravity. There are also physicists, including Kip Thorne and Charles Misner, who believe that not all singularities can be resolved, and that some likely still exist in the real universe despite the effects of quantum gravity. Finally, still others believe that singularities do not exist, and that their existence in general relativity does not matter, since general relativity is already believed to be an incomplete theory.

According to general relativity, every black hole has a singularity inside. For a non-rotating black hole, this region takes the shape of a single point; for a rotating black hole it is smeared out to form a ring singularity that lies in the plane of rotation. In both cases, the singular region has zero volume. All of the mass of the black hole ends up in the singularity. Since the singularity has nonzero mass in an infinitely small space, it can be thought of as having infinite density.

Chaotic oscillations of spacetime experienced by an object approaching a gravitational singularity

Observers falling into a Schwarzschild black hole (i.e., non-rotating and not charged) cannot avoid being carried into the singularity once they cross the event horizon. As they fall further into the black hole, they will be torn apart by the growing tidal forces in a process sometimes referred to as spaghettification or the noodle effect. Eventually, they will reach the singularity and be crushed into an infinitely small point.

Although in theory, the interior of a Schwarzschild black hole curves inwards towards a sharp point at the singularity, this model is only true when the spacetime inside the black hole had not been perturbed. Any perturbations, such as those caused by matter or radiation falling in, would cause space to oscillate chaotically near the singularity. Any matter falling in would experience intense tidal forces rapidly changing in direction, all while being compressed into an increasingly small volume.

In the case of a charged or rotating black hole, it is possible to avoid the singularity. Extending these solutions as far as possible reveals the hypothetical possibility of exiting the black hole into a different spacetime with the black hole acting as a wormhole. The possibility of travelling to another universe is, however, only theoretical, since any perturbation would destroy this possibility. It also appears to be possible to follow closed timelike curves (returning to one's own past) around the Kerr singularity, which leads to problems with causality like the grandfather paradox. However, processes inside the black hole, such as quantum gravity effects or mass inflation, might prevent closed timelike curves from arising.

To solve technical issues with general relativity, some models of gravity do not include black hole singularities. These theoretical black holes without singularities are called regular, or nonsingular, black holes. For example, the fuzzball model, based on string theory, models black holes using quantum microstates with no singularity or event horizon. The theory of loop quantum gravity proposes that the curvature and density at the center of a black hole is large, but not infinite.

== Types ==
There are multiple types of singularities, each with different physical features that have characteristics relevant to the theories from which they originally emerged, such as the different shapes of the singularities, conical and curved. They have also been hypothesized to occur without event horizons, structures that delineate one spacetime section from another in which events cannot affect past the horizon; these are called naked.

=== Conical ===
A conical singularity occurs when there is a point where the limit of some diffeomorphism invariant quantity does not exist or is infinite, in which case spacetime is not smooth at the point of the limit itself. Thus, spacetime looks like a cone around this point, where the singularity is located at the tip of the cone. The metric can be finite everywhere the coordinate system is used.

An example of such a conical singularity is a cosmic string and the central singularity of a Schwarzschild black hole.

=== Curvature ===
A simple illustration of a non-spinning black hole and its singularity

Solutions to the equations of general relativity or another theory of gravity (such as supergravity) often result in encountering points where the metric blows up to infinity. However, many of these points are completely regular, and the infinities are merely a result of using an inappropriate coordinate system at this point. To test whether there is a singularity at a certain point, one must check whether at this point diffeomorphism invariant quantities (i.e. scalars) become infinite. Such quantities are the same in every coordinate system: a change of coordinate systems will not cause these infinities to go away.

An example is the Schwarzschild solution that describes a non-rotating, uncharged black hole. In coordinate systems convenient for working in regions far away from the black hole, a part of the metric becomes infinite at the event horizon. However, spacetime at the event horizon is regular. The regularity becomes evident when changing to another coordinate system (such as the Kruskal coordinates), where the metric is perfectly smooth. On the other hand, in the center of the black hole, where the metric becomes infinite as well, the solutions suggest a singularity exists. The existence of the singularity can be verified by noting that the Kretschmann scalar, being the square of the Riemann tensor i.e. $R_{\mu\nu\rho\sigma}R^{\mu\nu\rho\sigma}$, which is diffeomorphism invariant, is infinite.

While in a non-rotating black hole the singularity occurs at a single point in the model coordinates, called a point singularity, in a rotating black hole, also known as a Kerr black hole, the singularity occurs on a ring (a circular line), known as a ring singularity. Such a singularity may also theoretically become a wormhole.

More generally, a spacetime is considered singular if it is geodesically incomplete, meaning that there are freely-falling particles whose motion cannot be determined beyond a finite time, being after the point of reaching the singularity. For example, any observer inside the event horizon of a non-rotating black hole would fall into its center within a finite period of time. The classical version of the Big Bang cosmological model of the universe contains a causal singularity at the start of time (t=0), where all time-like geodesics have no extensions into the past. Extrapolating backward to this hypothetical time 0 results in a universe with all spatial dimensions of size zero, infinite density, infinite temperature, and infinite spacetime curvature.

=== Naked singularity ===
A naked singularity is one that does not have an event horizon. Until the early 1990s, it was widely believed that general relativity hides every singularity behind an event horizon, making naked singularities impossible. This is referred to as the cosmic censorship hypothesis. However, in 1991, physicists Stuart Shapiro and Saul Teukolsky performed computer simulations of a rotating plane of dust that indicated that general relativity might allow for naked singularities. What these objects would actually look like in such a model is unknown, nor is it known whether singularities would still arise if the simplifying assumptions used to make the simulation were removed. However, it is hypothesized that light entering a singularity would similarly have its geodesics terminated, thus making the naked singularity look like a black hole.

In the Kerr metric, represents a spinning black hole in a vacuum for some ranges of its parameters. However, if the angular momentum ($J$) is high enough that $J$ exceeds $GM^{2}/c$ (or in Planck units, $J > M^{2}$); i.e. the spin exceeds what is normally viewed as the upper limit of its physically possible values, the ring singularity is not behind an event horizon.

Similarly, in the Reissner–Nordström geometry of a charged black hole, if the charge ($Q$) exceeds physically realistic values, the singularity has no event horizon. This corresponds to a case where $Q/\sqrt{4 \pi \epsilon_0}$ exceeds $M\sqrt{G}$ (or in Planck units, $Q > M$). Actual astrophysical black holes are not expected to possess any appreciable charge.

A black hole possessing the lowest $M$ value consistent with its $J$ and $Q$ values and the limits noted above; i.e., one just at the point of losing its event horizon, is termed extremal.

== See also ==
- 0-dimensional singularity: magnetic monopole
- 1-dimensional singularity: cosmic string
- 2-dimensional singularity: domain wall
- Fuzzball (string theory)
- Penrose–Hawking singularity theorems
- White hole
- BKL singularity
- Initial singularity
- Shock singularity
- Mass inflation
