= Indagationes Mathematicae =

- Discipline: Mathematics
- Language: English
- Edited by: Jan van Neerven

Publication details
- History: 1895 to present
- Publisher: Elsevier (Netherlands)
- Frequency: Quarterly
- Impact factor: 0.956 (2020)

Standard abbreviations
- ISO 4: Indag. Math.

Indexing
- ISSN: 0019-3577

Links
- Indagationes Mathematicae

Indagationes Mathematicae (Latin for "Mathematical Investigations") is a Dutch mathematics journal.

The journal originates from the Proceedings of the Royal Netherlands Academy of Arts and Sciences (or Proceedings of the Koninklijke Nederlandse Akademie van Wetenschappen), founded in 1895. From 1939, mathematics articles in this journal were published separately, under the alternative title Indagationes Mathematicae. In 1951 the proceedings officially split into three journals, keeping the same name but distinguished from each other by being in separate series. They were Series A (Mathematical Sciences), Series B (Physical Sciences), and Series C (Biological and Medical Sciences). At that time, Series A became published by the North-Holland Publishing Company; the volumes from this time are now listed by the publisher as Indagationes Mathematicae (Proceedings). In 1971, North-Holland merged with Elsevier. Beginning in 1990 the journal dropped the "(Proceedings)" from its title, leaving the journal's name in its current form as Indagationes Mathematicae. In 2010, sponsorship of the journal was transferred from the Royal Netherlands Academy to the Royal Dutch Mathematical Society, while it continued to be published by Elsevier.

The typesetting from this journal, including its mathematical formulae, was chosen by Donald Knuth as one of three examples of typesetting quality when he designed the TeX digital typesetting software from 1978.

It is indexed in Scopus and Zentralblatt MATH with a year 2020 impact factor of 0.956.
