= Pullback (cohomology) =

In algebraic topology, given a continuous map f: X → Y of topological spaces and a ring R, the pullback along f on cohomology theory is a grade-preserving R-algebra homomorphism:

$$f^*: H^*(Y; R) \to H^*(X; R)$$

from the cohomology ring of Y with coefficients in R to that of X. The use of the superscript is meant to indicate its contravariant nature: it reverses the direction of the map. For example, if X, Y are manifolds, R the field of real numbers, and the cohomology is de Rham cohomology, then the pullback is induced by the pullback of differential forms.

The homotopy invariance of cohomology states that if two maps f, g: X → Y are homotopic to each other, then they determine the same pullback: f^{*} = g^{*}.

In contrast, a pushforward for de Rham cohomology for example is given by integration-along-fibers.

== Definition from chain complexes ==
We first review the definition of the cohomology of the dual of a chain complex. Let R be a commutative ring, C a chain complex of R-modules and G an R-module. Just as one lets $H_*(C; G) = H_*(C \otimes_R G)$, one lets

$$H^*(C; G) = H^*(\operatorname{Hom}_R(C, G))$$

where Hom is the special case of the Hom between a chain complex and a cochain complex, with G viewed as a cochain complex concentrated in degree zero. (To make this rigorous, one needs to choose signs in the way similar to the signs in the tensor product of complexes.) For example, if C is the singular chain complex associated to a topological space X, then this is the definition of the singular cohomology of X with coefficients in G.

Now, let f: C → C' be a map of chain complexes (for example, it may be induced by a continuous map between topological spaces, see Pushforward (homology)). Then there is the map

$$f^*: \operatorname{Hom}_R(C', G) \to \operatorname{Hom}_R(C, G)$$

of cochain complexes, which in turn determines the pullback homomorphism

$$f^*: H^*(C'; G) \to H^*(C; G)$$

on the cohomology modules and cohomology ring.

If C, C' are singular chain complexes of spaces X, Y, then this is the pullback for singular cohomology theory.
