= Cauchy horizon =

Null hypersurface in general relativity

In physics, a Cauchy horizon is a light-like boundary of the domain of validity of a Cauchy problem (a particular boundary value problem of the theory of partial differential equations). One side of the horizon contains closed space-like geodesics and the other side contains closed time-like geodesics. The concept is named after Augustin-Louis Cauchy. The simplest example is the internal horizon of a Reissner–Nordström black hole.

Under the averaged weak energy condition (AWEC), Cauchy horizons are inherently unstable and severely susceptible to time-dependent perturbations. The smallest perturbation to the horizon would cause a contraction of proper time and an increase of energy density that would grow exponentially for an observer approaching the horizon. Such an observer would see the entire future history of the universe pass by as they approached the horizon until they suddenly hit a wall of infinite energy: a curvature singularity at the Cauchy horizon. However, since the region of spacetime inside the Cauchy horizon has closed timelike curves, it is subject to periodic boundary conditions, an example of the Casimir effect. This violates the average weak energy condition. If the spacetime inside the Cauchy horizon violates AWEC, then the horizon becomes stable and frequency boosting effects causing the increase in energy density near the horizon would be canceled out by the tendency of the spacetime to act as a divergent lens. Were this conjecture shown to be empirically true, it would provide a counter-example to the strong cosmic censorship conjecture. In 2018, it was shown that the spacetime behind the Cauchy horizon of a charged, rotating black hole exists, but is not smooth, so the strong cosmic censorship conjecture is false.

== Cauchy horizon singularity ==
Due to the increase in energy density near the Cauchy horizon and spacetime backreactions by infalling matter, a weak, null curvature singularity forms at the horizon. As the Cauchy horizon is approached, the gravitational field at the singularity becomes strong and the internal mass function diverges to infinity, causing tidal forces on an observer to increase without bound. However, the total tidal deformation on the observer remains finite. Along the Cauchy horizon, the radial Schwarzschild coordinate $r$ decreases monotonically until it reaches $r=0$, at which point the singularity becomes spacelike.

== In popular media ==
In the 2020 film Palm Springs, the character Sarah mentions the Cauchy horizon as she formulates a plan to escape a time loop.

In the pilot episode of 2021 Amazon original series Solos, the character Leah solves time travel with "the Cauchy horizon", which is central to the episode.

== See also ==
- Augustin-Louis Cauchy
- Event horizon
- Mass inflation
