= Cauchy surface =

Submanifold of Lorentzian manifold

In the mathematical field of Lorentzian geometry, a Cauchy surface, also called more properly Cauchy hypersurface, is a certain kind of submanifold of a Lorentzian manifold. In the application of Lorentzian geometry to the physics of general relativity, a Cauchy surface is usually interpreted as defining an "instant of time". In the mathematics of general relativity, Cauchy surfaces provide boundary conditions for the causal structure in which the Einstein equations can be solved (using, for example, the ADM formalism).

They are named for French mathematician Augustin-Louis Cauchy (1789–1857) due to their relevance for the Cauchy problem of general relativity.

== Informal introduction ==
Although it is usually phrased in terms of general relativity, the formal notion of a Cauchy surface can be understood in familiar terms. Suppose that humans can travel at a maximum speed of 20 miles per hour. This places constraints, for any given person, upon where they can reach by a certain time. For instance, it is impossible for a person who is in Mexico at 3 o'clock to arrive in Libya by 4 o'clock; however it is possible for a person who is in Manhattan at 1 o'clock to reach Brooklyn by 2 o'clock, since the locations are ten miles apart. So as to speak semi-formally, ignore time zones and travel difficulties, and suppose that travelers are immortal beings who have lived forever.

The system of all possible ways to fill in the four blanks in

A person in (location 1) at (time 1) can reach (location 2) by (time 2)

defines the notion of a causal structure. A Cauchy surface for this causal structure is a collection of pairs of locations and times such that, for any hypothetical traveler whatsoever, there is exactly one location and time pair in the collection for which the traveler was at the indicated location at the indicated time.

There are a number of uninteresting Cauchy surfaces. For instance, one Cauchy surface for this causal structure is given by considering the pairing of every location with the time of 1 o'clock (on a certain specified day), since any hypothetical traveler must have been at one specific location at this time; furthermore, no traveler can be at multiple locations at this time. By contrast, there cannot be any Cauchy surface for this causal structure that contains both the pair (Manhattan, 1 o'clock) and (Brooklyn, 2 o'clock) since there are hypothetical travelers that could have been in Manhattan at 1 o'clock and Brooklyn at 2 o'clock.

There are, also, some more interesting Cauchy surfaces which are harder to describe verbally. One could define a function τ from the collection of all locations into the collection of all times, such that the gradient of τ is everywhere less than 1/20 hours per mile. Then another example of a Cauchy surface is given by the collection of pairs

$$\Big\{\big(p,\tau(p)\big):p\text{ a location on Earth}\Big\}.$$

The point is that, for any hypothetical traveler, there must be some location p which the traveler was at, at time τ(p); this follows from the intermediate value theorem. Furthermore, it is impossible that there are two locations p and q and that there is some traveler who is at p at time τ(p) and at q at time τ(q), since by the mean value theorem they would at some point have had to travel at speed (dist(p, q))/(|τ(p) − τ(q)|), which must be larger than "20 miles per hour" due to the gradient condition on τ: a contradiction.

The physical theories of special relativity and general relativity define causal structures which are schematically of the above type ("a traveler either can or cannot reach a certain spacetime point from a certain other spacetime point"), with the exception that locations and times are not cleanly separable from one another. Hence one can speak of Cauchy surfaces for these causal structures as well.

== Mathematical definition and basic properties ==
Let (M̅, g̅) be a Lorentzian manifold. One says that a map c : (a, b) → M̅ is an inextensible differentiable timelike curve in (M̅, g̅) if:

- it is differentiable
- c'(t) is timelike for each t in the interval (a, b)
- c(t) does not approach a limit as t increases to b or as t decreases to a.

A subset S of M̅ is called a Cauchy surface if every inextensible differentiable timelike curve in (M̅, g̅) has exactly one point of intersection with S; if there exists such a subset, then (M̅, g̅) is called globally hyperbolic.

The following is automatically true of a Cauchy surface S:

The subset S ⊂ M̅ is topologically closed and is an embedded continuous (and even Lipschitz) submanifold of M̅. The flow of any continuous timelike vector field defines a homeomorphism S × ℝ → M̅. By considering the restriction of the inverse to another Cauchy surface, one sees that any two Cauchy surfaces are homeomorphic.

It is hard to say more about the nature of Cauchy surfaces in general. The example of

$$\Big\{(t,x,y,z):t^2=\frac{x^2+y^2+z^2}{2}\Big\}$$

as a Cauchy surface for Minkowski space ℝ^{3,1} makes clear that, even for the "simplest" Lorentzian manifolds, Cauchy surfaces may fail to be differentiable everywhere (in this case, at the origin), and that the homeomorphism S × ℝ → M̅ may fail to be even a C^{1}-diffeomorphism. However, the same argument as for a general Cauchy surface shows that if a Cauchy surface S is a C^{k}-submanifold of M̅, then the flow of a smooth timelike vector field defines a C^{k}-diffeomorphism S × ℝ → M̅, and that any two Cauchy surfaces which are both C^{k}-submanifolds of M̅ will be C^{k}-diffeomorphic.

Furthermore, at the cost of not being able to consider arbitrary Cauchy surface, it is always possible to find smooth Cauchy surfaces (Bernal & Sánchez 2003):

Given any smooth Lorentzian manifold (M̅, g̅) which has a Cauchy surface, there exists a Cauchy surface S which is an embedded and spacelike smooth submanifold of M̅ and such that S × ℝ is smoothly diffeomorphic to M̅.

== Cauchy developments ==
Let (M̅, g̅) be a time-oriented Lorentzian manifold. One says that a map c : (a, b) → M̅ is a past-inextensible differentiable causal curve in (M̅, g̅) if:

- it is differentiable
- c′(t) is either future-directed timelike or future-directed null for each t in the interval (a, b)
- c(t) does not approach a limit as t decreases to a

One defines a future-inextensible differentiable causal curve by the same criteria, with the phrase "as t decreases to a" replaced by "as t increases to b". Given a subset S of M̅, the future Cauchy development D^{+}(S) of S is defined to consist of all points p of M̅ such that if c : (a, b) → M̅ is any past-inextensible differentiable causal curve such that c(t) = p for some t in (a, b), then there exists some s in (a, b) with c(s) ∈ S. One defines the past Cauchy development D^{−}(S) by the same criteria, replacing "past-inextensible" with "future-inextensible".

Informally:

The future Cauchy development of S consists of all points p such that any observer arriving at p must have passed through S; the past Cauchy development of S consists of all points p such that any observer leaving from p will have to pass through S.

The Cauchy development D(S) is the union of the future Cauchy development and the past Cauchy development.

== Discussion ==
When there are no closed timelike curves, $D^{+}$ and $D^{-}$ are two different regions. When the time dimension closes up on itself everywhere so that it makes a circle, the future and the past of $\mathcal{S}$ are the same and both include $\mathcal{S}$. The Cauchy surface is defined rigorously in terms of intersections with inextensible curves in order to deal with this case of circular time. An inextensible curve is a curve with no ends: either it goes on forever, remaining timelike or null, or it closes in on itself to make a circle, a closed non-spacelike curve.

When there are closed timelike curves, or even when there are closed non-spacelike curves, a Cauchy surface still determines the future, but the future includes the surface itself. This means that the initial conditions obey a constraint, and the Cauchy surface is not of the same character as when the future and the past are disjoint.

If there are no closed timelike curves, then given $\mathcal{S}$ a partial Cauchy surface and if $D^{+}(\mathcal{S})\cup \mathcal{S}\cup D^{-}(\mathcal{S}) = \mathcal{M}$, the entire manifold, then $\mathcal{S}$ is a Cauchy surface. Any surface of constant $t$ in Minkowski space-time is a Cauchy surface.

== Cauchy horizon ==
If $D^{+}(\mathcal{S})\cup \mathcal{S}\cup D^{-}(\mathcal{S}) \not= \mathcal{M}$ then there exists a Cauchy horizon between $D^{\pm}(\mathcal{S})$ and regions of the manifold not completely determined by information on $\mathcal{S}$. A clear physical example of a Cauchy horizon is the second horizon inside a charged or rotating black hole. The outermost horizon is an event horizon, beyond which information cannot escape, but where the future is still determined from the conditions outside. Inside the inner horizon, the Cauchy horizon, the singularity is visible and to predict the future requires additional data about what comes out of the singularity.

Since a black hole Cauchy horizon only forms in a region where the geodesics are outgoing, in radial coordinates, in a region where the central singularity is repulsive, it is hard to imagine exactly how it forms. For this reason, Kerr and others suggest that a Cauchy horizon never forms, instead that the inner horizon is in fact a spacelike or timelike singularity. The inner horizon corresponds to the instability due to mass inflation.

A homogeneous space-time with a Cauchy horizon is anti-de Sitter space.
