= Pseudo-Riemannian manifold =

Differentiable manifold with nondegenerate metric tensor

In mathematical physics, a pseudo-Riemannian manifold, also called a semi-Riemannian manifold, is a differentiable manifold with a metric tensor that is everywhere nondegenerate. This is a generalization of a Riemannian manifold in which the requirement of positive-definiteness is relaxed.

Every tangent space of a pseudo-Riemannian manifold is a pseudo-Euclidean vector space.

A special case used in general relativity is a four-dimensional Lorentzian manifold for modeling spacetime, where tangent vectors can be classified as timelike, null, and spacelike.

== Introduction ==
=== Manifolds ===
In differential geometry, a differentiable manifold is a space that is locally similar to a Euclidean space. In an n-dimensional Euclidean space any point can be specified by n real numbers. These are called the coordinates of the point.

An n-dimensional differentiable manifold is a generalisation of n-dimensional Euclidean space. In a manifold it may only be possible to define coordinates locally. This is achieved by defining coordinate patches: subsets of the manifold that can be mapped into n-dimensional Euclidean space.

See Manifold, Differentiable manifold, Coordinate patch for more details.

=== Tangent spaces and metric tensors ===
Associated with each point $p$ in an $n$-dimensional differentiable manifold $M$ is a tangent space (denoted $T_pM$). This is an $n$-dimensional vector space whose elements can be thought of as equivalence classes of curves passing through the point $p$.

A metric tensor is a non-degenerate, smooth, symmetric, bilinear map that assigns a real number to pairs of tangent vectors at each tangent space of the manifold. Denoting the metric tensor by $g$ we can express this as

$$g : T_pM \times T_pM \to \mathbb{R}.$$

The map is symmetric and bilinear so if $X,Y,Z \in T_pM$ are tangent vectors at a point $p$ to the manifold $M$ then we have

- $\,g(X,Y) = g(Y,X)$
- $\,g(aX + Y, Z) = a g(X,Z) + g(Y,Z)$

for any real number $a\in\mathbb{R}$.

That $g$ is non-degenerate means there is no non-zero $X \in T_pM$ such that $g(X,Y) = 0$ for all $Y \in T_pM$.

=== Metric signatures ===
Given a metric tensor g on an n-dimensional real manifold, the quadratic form q(x) = g(x, x) associated with the metric tensor applied to each vector of any orthogonal basis produces n real values. By Sylvester's law of inertia, the number of each positive, negative and zero values produced in this manner are invariants of the metric tensor, independent of the choice of orthogonal basis. The signature (p, q, r) of the metric tensor gives these numbers, shown in the same order. A non-degenerate metric tensor has r = 0 and the signature may be denoted (p, q), where p + q = n.

== Definition ==
A pseudo-Riemannian manifold (M, g) is a differentiable manifold M that is equipped with an everywhere non-degenerate, smooth, symmetric metric tensor g.

Such a metric is called a pseudo-Riemannian metric. Applied to a vector field, the resulting scalar field value at any point of the manifold can be positive, negative or zero.

The signature of a pseudo-Riemannian metric is (p, q), where both p and q are non-negative. The non-degeneracy condition together with continuity implies that p and q remain unchanged throughout the manifold (assuming it is connected).

== Lorentzian manifold ==
A Lorentzian manifold is an important special case of a pseudo-Riemannian manifold in which the signature of the metric is (1, n−1) (equivalently, (n−1, 1); see Sign convention). Such metrics are called Lorentzian metrics. They are named after the Dutch physicist Hendrik Lorentz.

=== Applications in physics ===
After Riemannian manifolds, Lorentzian manifolds form the most important subclass of pseudo-Riemannian manifolds. They are important in applications of general relativity.

A principal premise of general relativity is that spacetime can be modeled as a 4-dimensional Lorentzian manifold of signature (3, 1) or, equivalently, (1, 3). Unlike Riemannian manifolds with positive-definite metrics, an indefinite signature allows tangent vectors to be classified into timelike, null or spacelike. With a signature of (p, 1) or (1, q), the manifold is also locally (and possibly globally) time-orientable (see Causal structure).

== Properties of pseudo-Riemannian manifolds ==
Just as Euclidean space $\mathbb{R}^n$ can be thought of as the local model of a Riemannian manifold, Minkowski space $\mathbb{R}^{n-1,1}$ with the flat Minkowski metric is the local model of a Lorentzian manifold. Likewise, the model space for a pseudo-Riemannian manifold of signature (p, q) is pseudo-Euclidean space $\mathbb{R}^{p,q}$, for which there exist coordinates x_{i} such that

$$g = dx_1^2 + \cdots + dx_p^2 - dx_{p+1}^2 - \cdots - dx_{p+q}^2$$

Some theorems of Riemannian geometry can be generalized to the pseudo-Riemannian case. In particular, the fundamental theorem of Riemannian geometry is true of all pseudo-Riemannian manifolds. This allows one to speak of the Levi-Civita connection on a pseudo-Riemannian manifold along with the associated curvature tensor. On the other hand, there are many theorems in Riemannian geometry that do not hold in the generalized case. For example, it is not true that every smooth manifold admits a pseudo-Riemannian metric of a given signature; there are certain topological obstructions. Furthermore, a submanifold does not always inherit the structure of a pseudo-Riemannian manifold; for example, the metric tensor becomes zero on any light-like curve. The Clifton–Pohl torus provides an example of a pseudo-Riemannian manifold that is compact but not complete, a combination of properties that the Hopf–Rinow theorem disallows for Riemannian manifolds.

== See also ==
- Causality conditions
- Globally hyperbolic spacetime
- Hyperbolic partial differential equation
- Orientable manifold
- Spacetime
- The Clockwork Rocket
