= Ronald Mallett =

American theoretical physicist (born 1945)

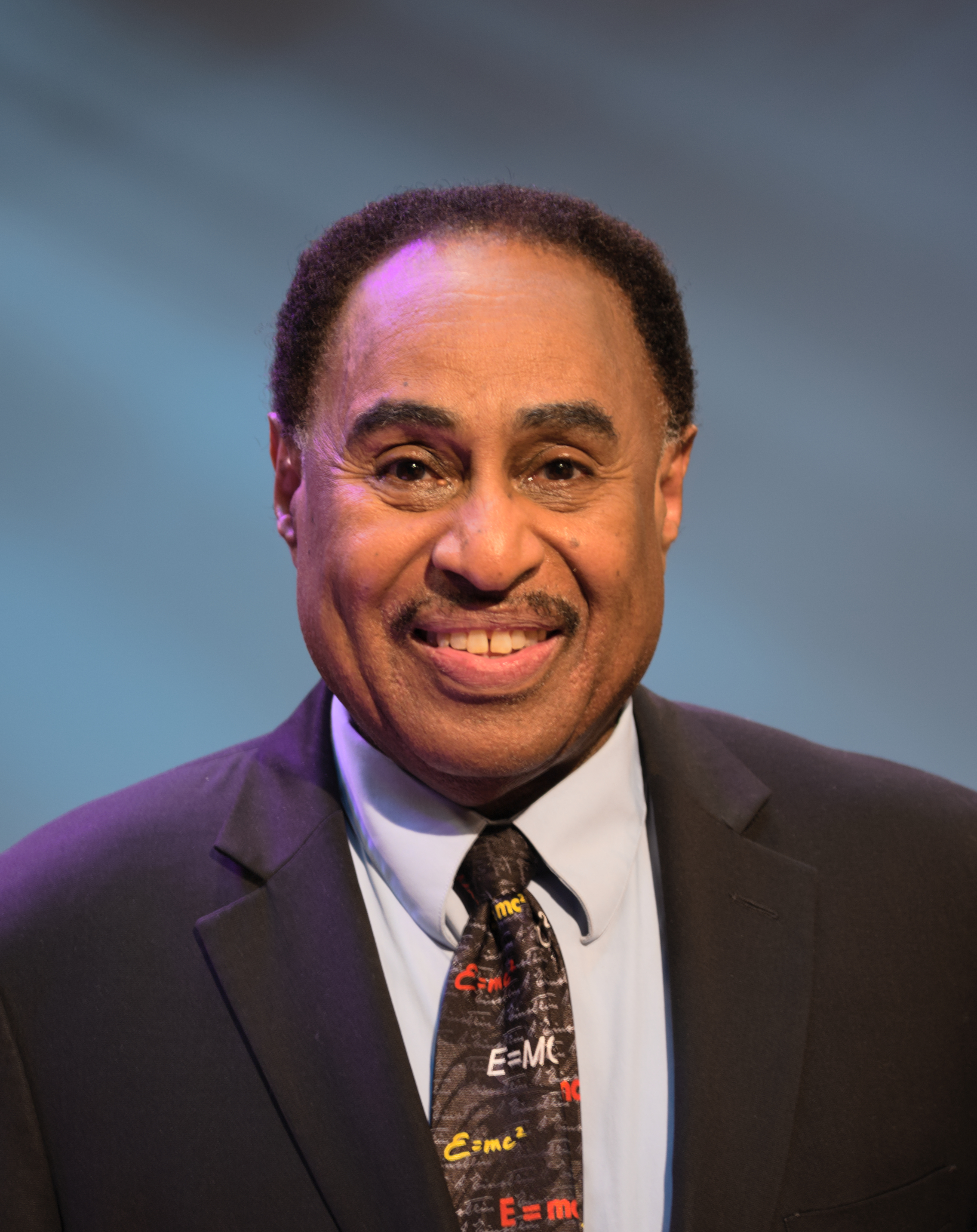
- Mallett in 2016
- Born: Ronald Lawrence Mallett; March 30, 1945 (age 81); Roaring Spring, Pennsylvania, U.S.
- Education: Pennsylvania State University
- Known for: Time travel, quantum cosmology, relativistic astrophysics
- Scientific career
- Fields: Astrophysics and cosmology
- Workplaces: United Technologies; University of Connecticut

Ronald Lawrence Mallett (born March 30, 1945) is an American theoretical physicist, academic and author. He has been a faculty member of the University of Connecticut since 1975 and is best known for his position on the possibility of time travel.

== Early life and education ==
Mallett was born to an African American family in Roaring Spring, Pennsylvania, on March 30, 1945, and grew up in The Bronx in New York City. When he was 10 years old, his father died at age 33 of a heart attack in 1955, which made him depressed and devastated. About one year later, at age 11, Mallett found a Classics Illustrated comic book version of H.G. Wells' The Time Machine in 1956. Inspired by this literature, he resolved to travel back in time to save his father. This idea became a lifelong obsession and the basis of his research into time travel. Mallett served in the United States Air Force for four years, during the Vietnam War. He returned to civilian life in 1966. This was the year that the science fiction TV series Star Trek started, in which he "quickly became immersed". During its first season, Mallett watched the episode The City on the Edge of Forever that "involved both the theme of time travel and lost love", and this became his favorite of the entire series.

In 1973, when he was 28 years old, Mallett earned his Ph.D. in physics from Pennsylvania State University. In the same year, he received the Graduate Assistant Award for Excellence in Teaching.

Mallett is a member of both the American Physical Society and the National Society of Black Physicists. He became an honorary member of the Connecticut Academy of Arts and Sciences in 2005.

== Career ==
In 1975, Mallett was appointed an assistant professor at the University of Connecticut. He was promoted to full professor in 1987 and has received multiple academic honors and distinctions. His research interests include black holes, general relativity, quantum cosmology, relativistic astrophysics and time travel. As of 2024, he is a Professor Emeritus of Physics at the University of Connecticut.

In 2007, Mallett's life story of pursuing a time machine was told on This American Life, Episode #324, Act 2.

=== Time travel research ===
Mallett's plans for a time machine are based upon a ring laser's properties in the context of Einstein's general theory of relativity. Mallett first argued that the ring laser would produce a limited amount of frame-dragging which might be measured experimentally, saying:

"In Einstein's General Theory of Relativity, both matter and energy can create a gravitational field. This means that the energy of a light beam can produce a gravitational field. My current research considers both the weak and strong gravitational fields produced by a single continuously circulating unidirectional beam of light. In the weak gravitational field of an unidirectional ring laser, it is predicted that a spinning neutral particle, when placed in the ring, is dragged around by the resulting gravitational field."

In a later paper, Mallett argued that at sufficient energies, the circulating laser might produce not just frame-dragging but also closed timelike curves (CTC), allowing time travel into the past:

For the strong gravitational field of a circulating cylinder of light, I have found new exact solutions of the Einstein field equations for the exterior and interior gravitational fields of the light cylinder. The exterior gravitational field is shown to contain closed timelike lines.

The presence of closed timelike lines indicates the possibility of time travel into the past. This creates the foundation for a time machine based on a circulating cylinder of light.

Mallett's book, Time Traveler: A Scientist's Personal Mission to Make Time Travel a Reality, co-written with author Bruce Henderson, was published in 2006. In June 2008, motion picture director Spike Lee's production company announced it had acquired the film rights to Mallett's book. Lee planned to co-write the movie script and direct the picture. Lee's project was never completed.

In 2006, Mallett declared that the possibility of time travel using a method based on a circulating light beam could be verified within the following decade. Mallett used general relativity to attempt to substantiate his claims. He created a prototype illustrating how lasers could be used to create a circulating beam of light that twists space and time, and has an equation which he claimed supports his theory.

=== Criticism of time-travel research ===
In a paper by Ken Olum and Allen Everett, the authors claimed to have found problems with Mallett's analysis. One of their objections is that the spacetime which Mallett used in his analysis contains a singularity even when the power to the laser is off, which would not be expected to arise naturally if the circulating laser were activated in previously empty space. Mallett has not offered a published response to Olum and Everett, but in his book Time Traveler, he mentions that he was unable to directly model the optical fiber or photonic crystal which bends the light's path as it travels through it, so the light circulates around rather than moving in a straight line; as a substitute, he chose to include a "line source" (a type of one-dimensional singularity) which would act as a "geometric constraint", bending spacetime in such a way that the light would circulate around on a helix-shaped path in vacuum (for an older solution involving an infinite cylinder which creates CTCs, in this case due to the cylinder's own rotation rather than light circulating around it, see the Tipler cylinder). He notes that closed timelike curves are present in a spacetime containing both the line source and the circulating light, while they are not present in a spacetime containing only the line source, so that "the closed loops in time had been produced by the circulating flow of light, and not by the non-moving line source." However, he does not provide any additional argument as to why we should expect to see closed timelike curves in a different spacetime where there is no line source, and where the light is caused to circulate due to passing through a physical substance like a photonic crystal rather than circulating in vacuum due to the curved spacetime around the line source.

Another objection by Olum and Everett is that even if Mallett's choice of spacetime were correct, the energy required to twist spacetime sufficiently would be huge, and that with lasers of the type in use today the ring would have to be much larger in circumference than the observable universe. At one point, Mallett agreed that in vacuum, the energy requirements would be impractical but noted that the energy required goes down as the speed of light goes down. He then argued that if the light is slowed down significantly by passing it through a medium (as in the experiments of Lene Hau where light was passed through a superfluid and slowed to about 17 metres per second), the needed energy would be attainable. However, the physicist J. Richard Gott argues that slowing down light by passing it through a medium cannot be treated as equivalent to lowering the constant c (the speed of light in vacuum) in the equations of General Relativity, saying:

One has to distinguish between the speed of light in empty space, which is a constant, and through any other medium, which can vary enormously. Light travels more slowly through water than through empty space, for example, but this does not mean that you age more slowly while scuba diving or that it is easier to twist space-time underwater.
The experiments done so far don't lower the speed of light in empty space; they just lower the speed of light in a medium and should not make it easier to twist space-time. Thus, it should not take any less mass-energy to form a black hole or a time machine of a given size in such a medium.

Later, Mallett abandoned the idea of using slowed light to reduce the energy, writing that, "For a time, I considered the possibility that slowing down light might increase the gravitational frame dragging effect of the ring laser ... Slow light, however, turned out to be helpful for my research."

Finally, Olum and Everett note a theorem proven by Stephen Hawking in a 1992 paper on the Chronology Protection Conjecture, which demonstrated that according to General Relativity it should be impossible to create closed timelike curves in any finite region that satisfies the weak energy condition, meaning that the region contains no exotic matter with negative energy. Mallett's original solution involved a spacetime containing a line source of infinite length, so it did not violate this theorem despite the absence of exotic matter, but Olum and Everett point out that the theorem "would, however, rule out the creation of CTC's in any finite-sized approximation to this spacetime."

== Personal life ==
His brother is artist Keith Mallett.

== Books ==
- Time Traveler: A Scientist's Personal Mission to Make Time Travel a Reality, Dr. Ronald L. Mallett with Bruce Henderson (2006). Thunder's Mouth Press. New York.

== See also ==
- List of contributors to general relativity
