= Time machine =

Device for time travel

A time machine is a fictional or hypothetical device that allows time travel. The term itself first appeared in fiction, in the 1895 novel The Time Machine. The physical basis for hypothetical time machines appear in discussions of solutions to the equations of general relativity.

== Types ==
A time machine is a device which brings about closed timelike curves—and thus enables time travel—where none would have existed otherwise.

— Stanford Encyclopedia of Philosophy (2024)

The Stanford Encyclopedia of Philosophy distinguishes between two different types of time machines: a science fiction variety that is not bound by the laws of physics and a hypothetical variety discussed in theoretical physics that relies on the creation of closed timelike curves (CTCs). Paul J. Nahin distinguishes between "weak" time machines that exploit existing CTCs and "strong" time machines that are themselves responsible for the creation of the CTCs.

=== Related concepts ===
Brave New Words: The Oxford Dictionary of Science Fiction and The Encyclopedia of Science Fiction distinguish between this and time slip, where time travel occurs without technological aid. The Encyclopedia of Science Fiction additionally distinguishes the concept of an immobile time gate or portal.

The Encyclopedia of Science Fiction lists a number of related concepts that allow for more limited interactions with other points in time, but not transportation: a time viewer allows for observation, while a time radio enables communication.

== In fiction ==
Time travel has appeared in fiction since at least the 1700s, but the first known instance of a machine being used for the purpose was Edward Page Mitchell's 1881 short story "The Clock That Went Backward". The term "time machine" itself was coined by H. G. Wells in the 1895 novel The Time Machine. Later in the history of science fiction, time machines have often been wearable.

== In physics ==
The first theoretical basis for a time machine based on our scientific understanding of the universe came in 1949, when Kurt Gödel demonstrated that CTCs are in principle consistent with Albert Einstein's theory of general relativity—although the so-called Gödel solution to the Einstein field equations requires a universe with properties different from ours (in particular, it would have to be rotating). Nahin comments that since travel along the CTCs in Gödel's scenario requires some form of accelerating force (as opposed to being a free-fall path, or geodesic) it is an example of a proper time machine, although since it does not create the CTCs but rather uses CTCs inherent in the structure of the universe it is only a time machine in the weaker sense. Several different theoretically possible—even if impracticable—time machine variants have been conceived of and described since. One of these is the Tipler cylinder, first described as a source of CTCs by Frank J. Tipler in 1974. Time machines that create CTCs by way of wormholes were described in theoretical research by Michael S. Morris, Kip Thorne, and Ulvi Yurtsever that was published in 1988.

== See also ==
- Category:Time machines
- Time loop
