= Temporal paradox =

Theoretical paradox resulting from time travel

A temporal paradox, time paradox, or time travel paradox, is an apparent or actual contradiction associated with the idea of time travel or other foreknowledge of the future. Temporal paradoxes arise from circumstances involving hypothetical time travel to the past. They are often employed to demonstrate the impossibility of time travel. Temporal paradoxes fall into three broad groups: bootstrap paradoxes, consistency paradoxes, and free will causality paradoxes exemplified by the Newcomb paradox.

== Causal loop ==
A causal loop or "bootstrap paradox". A billiard ball delivers its past self a strike that slightly changes its trajectory in the exact way required for it to change its past trajectory. The change in trajectory appears to have caused itself.

A causal loop, also known as a bootstrap paradox, information loop, information paradox, or ontological paradox, occurs when any event, such as an action, information, an object, or a person, ultimately causes itself, as a consequence of either retrocausality or time travel. A causal loop appears to violate causality by allowing future events to influence the past and cause themselves. This is sometimes called "bootstrapping", which derives from the idiom "pull oneself up by one's bootstraps."

Backward time travel would allow information, people, or objects whose histories seem to "come from nowhere". Such causally looped events then exist in spacetime, but their origin cannot be determined. The notion of objects or information that are "self-existing" in this way is often viewed as paradoxical. Sergey Krasnikov writes that both paradoxes, either information or an object looping through time, are the same; the primary apparent paradox is a physical system evolving into a state in a way that is not governed by its laws. He does not find these paradoxical and attributes problems regarding the validity of time travel to other factors in the interpretation of general relativity.

An example of the causal loop (Stanislaw Lem characterized it as smaller than the minimal loop) occurs in the 1958 science fiction short story "—All You Zombies—", by Robert A. Heinlein, wherein the main character, an intersex individual, becomes both their own mother and father; the 2014 film Predestination is based on the story. Allen Everett gives the movie Somewhere in Time as an example involving an object with no origin: an old woman gives a watch to a playwright who later travels back in time and meets the same woman when she was young, and shows her the watch that she will later give to him. Smeenk uses the term "predestination paradox" to refer specifically to situations in which a time traveler goes back in time to try to prevent some event in the past.

== Consistency paradox ==
A consistency paradox or "grandfather paradox". A billiard ball delivers its past self a strike that prevents it from entering the time machine that caused it to strike its past self, putting into question how its older self could ever emerge from the time machine and divert its course.

The consistency paradox, commonly known as the grandfather paradox, occurs when the past is changed in any way. The paradox of changing the past stems from modal logic: if it is necessarily true that the past happened in a certain way, then it is false and impossible for the past to have occurred in any other way, so any change to the past would be a paradox. Consistency paradoxes occur whenever any change to the past is possible.

A common example given is a time traveler killing their grandfather so he can't father one of their parents, thus preventing their own conception. If the traveler were not born, they could not kill their grandfather; therefore, the grandfather proceeds to beget the traveler's parent who begets the traveler. This scenario is self-contradictory. One proposed resolution for this paradox is that a time traveller can do anything that did happen, but cannot do anything that did not happen. Another proposed resolution is simply that time travel is impossible.

=== Variants ===
The grandfather paradox encompasses any change to the past, and it is presented in many variations, including killing one's past self. Both the "retro-suicide paradox" and the "grandfather paradox" appeared in letters written into Amazing Stories in the 1920s. Another variant of the grandfather paradox is the "Hitler paradox" or "Hitler's murder paradox", in which the protagonist travels back in time to murder Adolf Hitler before he can rise to power in Germany, thus preventing World War II and the Holocaust. Rather than necessarily physically preventing time travel, the action removes any reason for the travel, along with any knowledge that the reason ever existed.

Physicist John Garrison et al. give a variation of the paradox of an electronic circuit that sends a signal through a time machine to shut itself off, and receives the signal before it sends it.

== Free will and causality ==
Newcomb's paradox is a thought experiment showing an apparent contradiction between the expected utility principle and the strategic dominance principle. The thought experiment is often extended to explore causality and free will.

Predestination sometimes involves a supernatural power, though it could be the result of other "infallible foreknowledge" mechanisms. By allowing for "perfect predictors", for example if time travel exists as a mechanism for making perfect predictions by allowing true knowledge of the future, then perfect predictions appear to contradict free will because decisions apparently made with free will are already known to the perfect predictor, meaning the choice apparently made with free will was already made. Problems arising from infallibility and influence from the future are explored in the infallible predictor version of Newcomb's paradox.

== Proposed resolutions ==
=== Logical impossibility of time travel ===
Even without knowing whether time travel to the past is physically possible, it is possible to show using modal logic that changing the past results in a logical contradiction. If it is necessarily true that the past happened in a certain way, then it is false and impossible for the past to have occurred in any other way. A time traveler would not be able to change the past from the way it is, but would only act in a way that is already consistent with what necessarily happened.

Consideration of the grandfather paradox has led some to the idea that time travel is by its very nature paradoxical and therefore logically impossible. For example, the philosopher Bradley Dowden made this sort of argument in the textbook Logical Reasoning, arguing that the possibility of creating a contradiction rules out time travel to the past entirely. However, some philosophers and scientists believe that time travel into the past need not be logically impossible provided that there is no possibility of changing the past, as suggested, for example, by the Novikov self-consistency principle. Dowden revised his view after being convinced of this in an exchange with the philosopher Norman Swartz.

=== Fixed spacetime ===
Logician Kurt Gödel speculated, through considerations of the possibility of backward time travel in a hypothetical universe described by a Gödel metric, that time might itself be a sort of illusion.

=== Novikov self-consistency principle ===
A 1992 paper by physicists Andrei Lossev and Igor Novikov labeled items without origin (items that seem to "come from nowhere," as mentioned above) as Jinn, with the singular term Jinnee. This terminology was inspired by the Jinn of the Quran, which are described as leaving no trace when they disappear. Lossev and Novikov allowed the term "Jinn" to cover both objects and information with the reflexive origin; they called the former "Jinn of the first kind", and the latter "Jinn of the second kind". They point out that an object making circular passage through time must be identical whenever it is brought back to the past, otherwise it would create an inconsistency; the second law of thermodynamics seems to require that the object tends to a lower energy state throughout its history, and such objects that are identical in repeating points in their history seem to contradict this, but Lossev and Novikov argued that since the second law only requires entropy to increase in closed systems, a Jinnee could interact with its environment in such a way as to regain "lost" entropy. They emphasize that there is no "strict difference" between Jinn of the first and second kind. Krasnikov equivocates between "Jinn", "self-sufficient loops", and "self-existing objects", calling them "lions" or "looping or intruding objects", and asserts that they are no less physical than conventional objects, "which, after all, also could appear only from either infinity or a singularity."

The self-consistency principle developed by Igor Dmitriyevich Novikov expresses one view as to how backward time travel would be possible without the generation of paradoxes. According to this hypothesis, even though general relativity permits some exact solutions that allow for time travel that contain closed timelike curves that lead back to the same point in spacetime, physics in or near closed timelike curves (time machines) can only be consistent with the universal laws of physics, and thus only self-consistent events can occur. Anything a time traveler does in the past must have been part of history all along, and the time traveler can never do anything to prevent the trip back in time from happening, since this would represent an inconsistency. The authors concluded that time travel need not lead to unresolvable paradoxes, regardless of what type of object was sent to the past.

Physicist Joseph Polchinski considered a potentially paradoxical situation involving a billiard ball that is fired into a wormhole at just the right angle such that it will be sent back in time and collides with its earlier self, knocking it off course, which would stop it from entering the wormhole in the first place. Kip Thorne referred to this problem as "Polchinski's paradox". Thorne and two of his students at Caltech, Fernando Echeverria and Gunnar Klinkhammer, went on to find a solution that avoided any inconsistencies, and found that there was more than one self-consistent solution, with slightly different angles for the glancing blow in each case. Later analysis by Thorne and Robert Forward showed that for certain initial trajectories of the billiard ball, there could be an infinite number of self-consistent solutions. It is plausible that there exist self-consistent extensions for every possible initial trajectory, although this has not been proven. The lack of constraints on initial conditions only applies to spacetime outside of the chronology-violating region of spacetime; the constraints on the chronology-violating region might prove to be paradoxical, but this is not yet known.

Novikov's views are not widely accepted. Visser views causal loops and Novikov's self-consistency principle as an ad hoc solution, and supposes that there are far more damaging implications of time travel. Krasnikov similarly finds no inherent fault in causal loops but finds other problems with time travel in general relativity. Another conjecture, the cosmic censorship hypothesis, suggests that every closed timelike curve passes through an event horizon, which prevents such causal loops from being observed.

=== Interacting many-worlds ===
The many-worlds interpretation (MWI) of quantum physics poses that all possible quantum events can occur in mutually exclusive histories. A variation of this interpretation, called interacting many-worlds, may involve time travelers arriving in a different universe than the one they came from. It's been argued that since the traveler arrives in a different universe's history and not their own history, this is not "genuine" time travel. Stephen Hawking has argued that even if the MWI is correct, we should expect each time traveler to experience a single self-consistent history so that time travelers remain within their world rather than traveling to a different one.

David Deutsch has proposed that quantum computation with a negative delay—backward time travel—produces only self-consistent solutions, and the chronology-violating region imposes constraints that are not apparent through classical reasoning. Deutsch's self-consistency condition has been demonstrated as capable of being fulfilled to arbitrary precision by any system subject to the laws of classical statistical mechanics, even if it is not built up by quantum systems. Allen Everett has argued that even if Deutsch's approach is correct, it would imply that any macroscopic object composed of multiple particles would be split apart when traveling back in time, with different particles emerging in different worlds.

== See also ==
- Causal structure
- Causality
- Chronology protection conjecture
- Cosmic censorship hypothesis
- Fermi paradox
- Münchhausen trilemma
- Quantum mechanics of time travel
- Retrocausality
- Time loop
- Time travel in fiction
- Time travel
- Wormhole
