= Tipler cylinder =

Hypothetical object usable as a time machine

A Tipler cylinder, also called a Tipler time machine, is a hypothetical object theorized to be a potential mode of time travel—although results have shown that a Tipler cylinder could only allow time travel if its length were infinite or with the existence of negative energy.

== Discovery ==
The Tipler cylinder was discovered as a solution to the equations of general relativity by Willem Jacob van Stockum in 1936 and Kornel Lanczos in 1924, but not recognized as allowing closed timelike curves until an analysis by Frank Tipler in 1974. In the article "Rotating Cylinders and the Possibility of Global Causality Violation", Tipler showed that in a spacetime containing a "sufficiently large rotating cylinder" spinning around its axis, the cylinder should create a frame-dragging effect. This frame-dragging effect warps spacetime in such a way that the light cones of objects in the cylinder's proximity become tilted, so that part of the light cone then points backwards along the time axis on a spacetime diagram. Therefore, a spacecraft accelerating sufficiently in the appropriate direction can travel backwards through time along a closed timelike curve.

CTCs are associated, in Lorentzian manifolds which are interpreted physically as spacetimes, with the possibility of causal anomalies such as a person going back in time and potentially shooting their own grandfather, although paradoxes might be avoided using some constraint such as the Novikov self-consistency principle. They appear in some of the most important exact solutions in general relativity, including the Kerr vacuum (which models a rotating black hole) and the van Stockum dust (which models a cylindrically symmetrical configuration of rotating pressureless fluid or dust).

== Practicality ==
An objection to the practicality of building a Tipler cylinder was discovered by Stephen Hawking, who argued that according to general relativity it is impossible to build a time machine in any finite region that satisfies the weak energy condition, meaning that the region contains no exotic matter with negative energy. The Tipler cylinder, on the other hand, does not involve any negative energy. Tipler's original solution involved a cylinder of infinite length, which is easier to analyze mathematically, and although Tipler suggested that a finite cylinder might produce closed timelike curves if the rotation rate were fast enough, he did not prove this. But Hawking comments: "it can't be done with positive energy density everywhere! I can prove that to build a finite time machine, you need negative energy." Hawking's argument appears in his 1992 paper on the chronology protection conjecture (though the argument is distinct from the conjecture itself, since the argument asserts that classical general relativity predicts a finite region containing closed timelike curves can only be created if there is a violation of the weak energy condition in that region, whereas the conjecture predicts that closed timelike curves will prove to be impossible in a future theory of quantum gravity which replaces general relativity). In the paper, he examines "the case that the causality violations appear in a finite region of spacetime without curvature singularities" and proves that "[t]here will be a Cauchy horizon that is compactly generated and that in general contains one or more closed null geodesics which will be incomplete. One can define geometrical quantities that measure the Lorentz boost and area increase on going round these closed null geodesics. If the causality violation developed from a noncompact initial surface, the averaged weak energy condition must be violated on the Cauchy horizon."
