= Quantum mechanics of time travel =

Time travel using quantum mechanics

The theoretical study of time travel generally follows the laws of general relativity. Quantum mechanics requires physicists to solve equations describing how probabilities behave along closed timelike curves (CTCs), which are theoretical loops in spacetime that might make it possible to travel through time.

In the 1980s, Igor Novikov proposed the self-consistency principle. According to this principle, any changes made by a time traveler in the past must not create historical paradoxes. If a time traveler attempts to change the past, the laws of physics will ensure that events unfold in a way that avoids paradoxes. This means that while a time traveler can influence past events, those influences must ultimately lead to a consistent historical narrative.

However, Novikov's self-consistency principle has been debated in relation to certain interpretations of quantum mechanics. Specifically, it raises questions about how it interacts with fundamental principles such as unitarity and linearity. Unitarity ensures that the total probability of all possible outcomes in a quantum system always sums to 1, preserving the predictability of quantum events. Linearity ensures that quantum evolution preserves superpositions, allowing quantum systems to exist in multiple states simultaneously.

There are two main approaches to explaining quantum time travel while incorporating Novikov's self-consistency principle. The first approach uses density matrices to describe the probabilities of different outcomes in quantum systems, providing a statistical framework that can accommodate the constraints of CTCs. The second approach involves state vectors, which describe the quantum state of a system. Both approaches can lead to insights into how time travel might be reconciled with quantum mechanics, although they may introduce concepts that challenge conventional understandings of these theories.

== Deutsch's prescription for closed timelike curves (CTCs) ==
In 1991, David Deutsch proposed a method to explain how quantum systems interact with closed timelike curves (CTCs) using time evolution equations. This method aims to address paradoxes like the grandfather paradox, which suggests that a time traveler who stops their own birth would create a contradiction. One interpretation of Deutsch's approach is that it allows for self-consistency without necessarily implying the existence of parallel universes.

=== Method overview ===
To analyze the system, Deutsch divided it into two parts: a subsystem outside the CTC and the CTC itself. To describe the combined evolution of both parts over time, he used a unitary operator (U). This approach relies on a specific mathematical framework to describe quantum systems. The overall state is represented by combining the density matrices (ρ) for both parts using a tensor product (⊗). While Deutsch's approach does not assume initial correlation between these two parts, this does not inherently break time symmetry.

Deutsch's proposal uses the following key equation to describe the fixed-point density matrix (ρCTC) for the CTC:

$\rho_{\text{CTC}} = \text{Tr}_A \left[ U \left( \rho_A \otimes \rho_{\text{CTC}} \right) U^\dagger\right]$.

The unitary evolution involving both the CTC and the external subsystem determines the density matrix of the CTC as a fixed point, focusing on its state.

=== Ensuring self-consistency ===
Deutsch's proposal ensures that the CTC returns to a self-consistent state after each loop. However, if a system retains memories after traveling through a CTC, it could create scenarios where it appears to have experienced different possible pasts.

Furthermore, Deutsch's method may not align with common probability calculations in quantum mechanics unless we consider multiple paths leading to the same outcome. There can also be multiple solutions (fixed points) for the system's state after the loop, introducing randomness (nondeterminism). Deutsch suggested using solutions that maximize entropy, aligning with systems' natural tendency to evolve toward higher entropy states.

To calculate the final state outside the CTC, trace operations consider only the external system's state after combining both systems' evolution.

=== Implications and criticisms ===
Deutsch's approach has intriguing implications for paradoxes like the grandfather paradox. For instance, if everything except a single qubit travels through a time machine and flips its value according to a specific operator:

$$U = \begin{pmatrix}0 & 1\\1 & 0\end{pmatrix}$$.

Deutsch argues that maximizing von Neumann entropy is relevant in this context. In this scenario, outcomes may mix starting at 0 and ending at 1 or vice versa. While this interpretation can align with many-worlds views of quantum mechanics, it does not necessarily imply branching timelines after interacting with a CTC.

Researchers have explored Deutsch's ideas further. If feasible, his model might allow computers near a time machine to solve problems beyond classical capabilities; however, debates about CTCs' feasibility continue.

Despite its theoretical nature, Deutsch's proposal has faced significant criticism. For example, Tolksdorf and Verch demonstrated that quantum systems in spacetimes without CTCs can achieve results similar to Deutsch's criterion with any prescribed accuracy. This finding challenges claims that quantum simulations of CTCs are related to closed timelike curves as understood in general relativity. Their research also shows that classical systems governed by statistical mechanics could also meet these criteria without invoking peculiarities attributed solely to quantum mechanics. Consequently, they argue that their findings raise doubts about Deutsch's explanation of his time travel scenario using many-worlds interpretations of quantum physics.

== Lloyd's theory of post-selected time travel ==
Seth Lloyd, along with his collaborators, proposed a theory based on quantum post-selection to address the paradoxes typically associated with the concept. This approach provides a self-consistent framework for time travel through closed timelike curves (CTCs), which are paths in spacetime that return to their starting point. Lloyd's model is notable for its direct handling of potential paradoxes, such as the grandfather paradox, by rendering any paradoxical outcome to have zero probability.

The theory conceptualizes time travel as a form of quantum teleportation, where the post-selection of a specific quantum state ensures self-consistency, in line with the Novikov self-consistency principle. This model is physically distinct from other proposals, such as David Deutsch's model for CTCs, and is argued to be consistent with path-integral formulations of quantum gravity.

=== Theoretical Framework ===
Lloyd's model of post-selected CTCs (P-CTCs) treats a closed timelike curve as a communication channel from the future to the past. The mechanism is built upon the principles of quantum teleportation, but with the crucial difference that the outcome of the Bell measurement in the teleportation protocol is post-selected to be a specific state.

The general setup involves a system that is to travel through the CTC, which we can call the "chrononaut" system (C), and an ancillary system (A) that remains in the chronology-respecting region of spacetime. The key idea is to prepare an entangled state between the chrononaut and the ancillary system. The chrononaut then enters the CTC and interacts with its past self. The final state of the combined system is then post-selected to be the same entangled state as the initial state. This post-selection is the mathematical tool that enforces self-consistency.

==== Mathematical Formulation ====
Let the Hilbert space of the chrononaut system be $\mathcal{H}_C$ and the Hilbert space of a system it interacts with in the past be $\mathcal{H}_S$. The initial state of the system S is $|\psi\rangle_{in}$. The chrononaut system is prepared in one part of a maximally entangled state, $|\Phi^+\rangle_{CA}$, where A is an ancillary system that does not enter the CTC. The state of the chrononaut C that enters the future end of the CTC is described by tracing out the ancilla A from $|\Phi^+\rangle_{CA}$.

The chrononaut C then travels to the past and interacts with the system S via a unitary operator $U_{CS}$. After the interaction, the state of the combined system is $U_{CS} (|\chi\rangle_C \otimes |\psi\rangle_{in})$, where $|\chi\rangle_C$ is the state of the particle emerging from the past end of the CTC.

The self-consistency condition is imposed by asserting that the state of the chrononaut entering the CTC from the future is the same as the state emerging from it in the past. In the post-selection formalism, this is achieved by projecting the final state of the chrononaut and the ancilla onto the initial entangled state $|\Phi^+\rangle_{CA}$.

The output state of the system S, $|\psi\rangle_{out}$, after the interaction with the time-traveling system, is given by:

$|\psi\rangle_{out} = \langle\Phi^+|_{CA} U_{CS} (|\chi\rangle_C \otimes |\psi\rangle_{in})$

However, to satisfy the consistency condition, the state $|\chi\rangle_C$ must be the result of the evolution. The full evolution of an external system interacting with the P-CTC is described by an effective operator. If an input state $\rho_{in}$ interacts with a P-CTC, the output state $\rho_{out}$ is given by:

$\rho_{out} = \frac{\mathcal{P} U (\rho_{in} \otimes \rho_{CTC}) U^\dagger \mathcal{P}^\dagger}{\mathrm{Tr}[\mathcal{P} U (\rho_{in} \otimes \rho_{CTC}) U^\dagger \mathcal{P}^\dagger]}$

where $\rho_{CTC}$ is the initial state of the time-traveling system, $U$ is the unitary interaction between the system and the time-traveler, and $\mathcal{P}$ is the projection operator that enforces the post-selection. This projection ensures that only self-consistent histories are allowed.

=== Resolution of the Grandfather Paradox ===
The grandfather paradox describes a scenario where a time traveler goes to the past and prevents their own birth, thus creating a logical inconsistency. In Lloyd's post-selection model, any action that would lead to a paradox is projected out by the post-selection process, meaning its probability of occurring is zero.

Consider a simplified quantum version of the paradox: a qubit is sent back in time to "flip" its past self. Let the initial state of the qubit be $|0\rangle$. It interacts with its future self through a CNOT gate, where the future self is the control qubit and the past self is the target qubit. If the future self is in state $|1\rangle$, it flips the past self to $|1\rangle$. This new state then travels forward in time to become the future self. This creates a contradiction: if the qubit starts as $|0\rangle$, it doesn't get flipped and remains $|0\rangle$. If it were $|1\rangle$, it would flip its past self to $|1\rangle$, which is consistent.

In the P-CTC model, the initial state of the time-traveling qubit is entangled with an ancillary qubit. The final state is then post-selected to be the same entangled state. It can be shown that under these conditions, the probability of the paradoxical outcome (the qubit starting as $|0\rangle$ and being flipped to $|1\rangle$ by its future self) is zero. The universe, through the principles of quantum mechanics and post-selection, effectively "conspires" to prevent paradoxical situations. For instance, if a time traveler were to try and shoot their grandfather, the gun might misfire, or some other improbable event would occur to prevent the paradox.

=== Comparison with Deutsch's Model ===
David Deutsch proposed an earlier quantum mechanical model for CTCs based on a self-consistency condition that requires the density matrix of the time-traveling system to be a fixed point of the evolution equation. Lloyd's P-CTC model differs from Deutsch's in several key aspects:

- Purity of States: P-CTCs map pure states to pure states, whereas Deutsch's model often results in mixed states.
- Non-linearity: The post-selection in Lloyd's model introduces a form of non-linearity that is different from the non-linearity in Deutsch's model.
- Resolution of Paradoxes: While both models resolve the grandfather paradox, they do so differently. In Deutsch's model, the time traveler would find themselves in a superposition of states where they exist with a certain probability. In Lloyd's model, any action that would lead to a paradox is strictly forbidden by the post-selection.

=== Implications for Computation ===
The P-CTC model has been shown to have profound implications for the power of computation. It has been suggested that a computer with access to a P-CTC could solve problems that are believed to be intractable for standard quantum computers, including problems in the complexity class PP (Probabilistic Polynomial time). This computational power stems from the ability of post-selection to effectively amplify the probability of desired outcomes.

== Entropy and computation ==
Michael Devin (2001) proposed a model that incorporates closed timelike curves (CTCs) into thermodynamics, suggesting it as a potential way to address the grandfather paradox. This model introduces a "noise" factor to account for imperfections in time travel, proposing a framework that could help mitigate paradoxes. In contrast, Carlo Rovelli has argued that thermodynamics inhibits time travel to the past.

== See also ==
- Novikov self-consistency principle
- Grandfather paradox
- Causal loop
- Chronology protection conjecture
- Retrocausality
