= Igor Novikov (astrophysicist) =

Russian astrophysicist (born 1935)

Igor Dmitriyevich Novikov
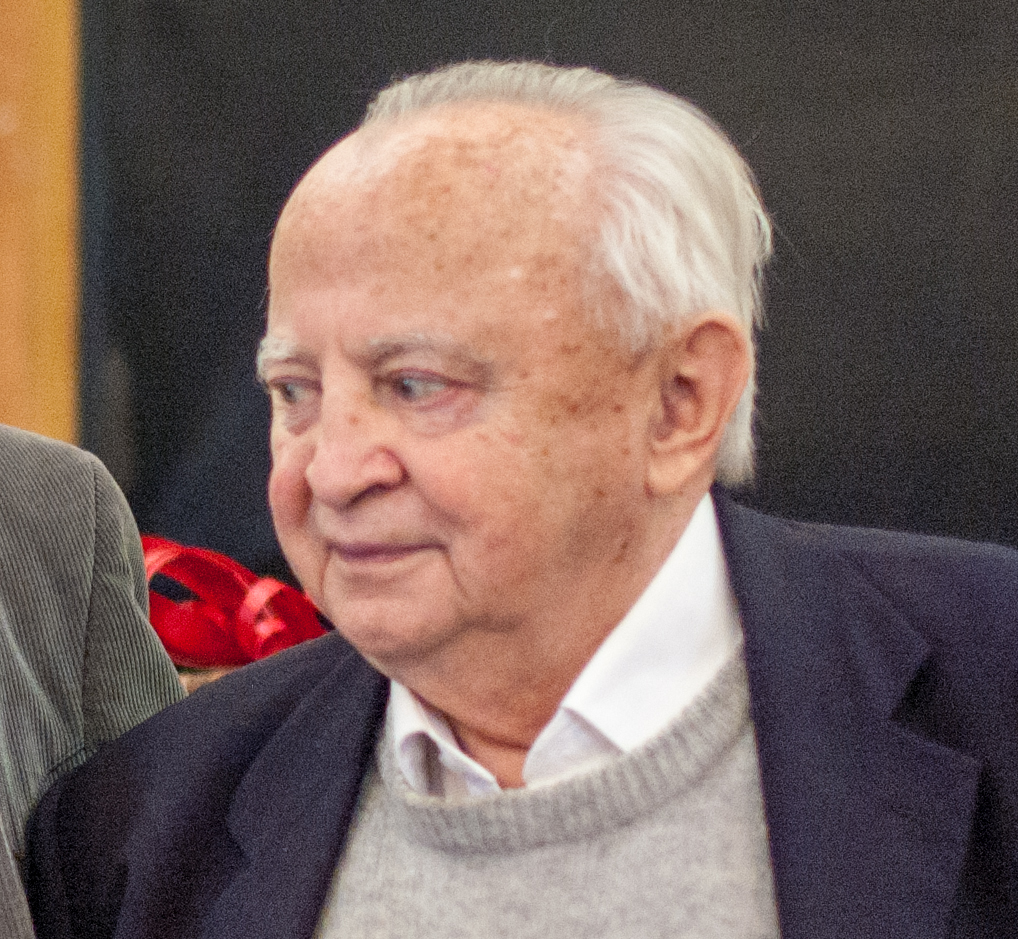
- Novikov in 2016
- Born: November 10, 1935 (age 90); Moscow, Russian SFSR
- Scientific career
- Fields: theoretical astrophysics and cosmology
- Thesis: Early stages of cosmological expansion [Ранние стадии космологического расширения] (1970)
- Doctoral advisor: Iosif Shklovsky

Igor Dmitriyevich Novikov (Russian: И́горь Дми́триевич Но́виков; born November 10, 1935) is a Russian theoretical astrophysicist and cosmologist. Novikov put forward the idea of white holes in 1964. He also formulated the Novikov self-consistency principle in the mid-1980s, a contribution to the theory of time travel.

Novikov moved to Copenhagen, Denmark, where he worked and taught at the Niels Bohr Institute. He returned to Russia in 2001.

== Biography ==
Novikov gained his PhD degree in astrophysics in 1965 and the Russian D.Sc. degree in astrophysics in 1970. From 1974 to 1990 he was head of the Department of Relativistic Astrophysics at the Russian Space Research Institute in Moscow. Before 1991 he was head of the Department of Theoretical Astrophysics at the Lebedev Physical Institute in Moscow and has been a professor at Moscow State University. Since 1994 he has been director of the Theoretical Astrophysics Center (TAC) of the University of Copenhagen, Denmark. He is currently also a professor of astrophysics at the Observatory of the University of Copenhagen, where he has been since 1991. Since 1998 he has been a Fellow of the Royal Astronomical Society.

In 2020 Novikov was awarded the first John Archibald Wheeler Prize, together with physicist Kip Thorne (Caltech) and Oxford University professor Roger Penrose. The award was given for his contribution to the development of the general theory of relativity and the physics of black holes. The prize was awarded by the President of the Italian Physical Society at the official awards ceremony in Rome on May 30, 2022 (delayed due to the Covid-19 pandemic).

== See also ==
- Closed timelike curve
- Cosmic microwave background
- Observational cosmology
- Quantum mechanics of time travel
- Primordial black hole
- Superradiance
- White hole
