= Timelike homotopy =

In mathematics, certain curves on a Lorentzian manifold are distinguished as timelike. A timelike homotopy between two timelike curves is a homotopy such that each intermediate curve is timelike. No closed timelike curve (CTC) on a Lorentzian manifold is timelike homotopic to a point (that is, null timelike homotopic); such a manifold is therefore said to be multiply connected by timelike curves (or timelike multiply connected). No CTC can be continuously deformed as a CTC (is timelike homotopic) to a point, as that point would not be causally well behaved. Therefore, any Lorentzian manifold containing a CTC is said to be timelike multiply connected. A Lorentzian manifold that does not contain a CTC is said to be timelike simply connected.

A manifold such as the 3-sphere can be simply connected (by any type of curve), and at the same time be timelike multiply connected. Equivalence classes of timelike homotopic curves define their own fundamental group, as noted by Smith (1967). A smooth topological feature which prevents a CTC from being deformed to a point may be called a timelike topological feature.

Any Lorentzian manifold which is timelike multiply connected has a diffeomorphic universal covering space which is timelike simply connected. For instance, a three-sphere with a Lorentzian metric is timelike multiply connected, (because any compact Lorentzian manifold contains a CTC), but has a diffeomorphic universal covering space which contains no CTC (and is therefore not compact). By contrast, a three-sphere with the standard metric is simply connected, and is therefore its own universal cover.
