= Roman ring =

Configuration of wormholes

In general relativity, a Roman ring (proposed by Matt Visser in 1997 and named after the Roman arch, a concept proposed by Mike Morris and Kip Thorne in 1988 and named after physicist Tom Roman) is a configuration of wormholes where for each individual wormhole the time difference across its mouths (caused by the mouths moving relative to each other) is such that it may not allow a closed timelike curve (CTC), or 'closed time loop', but if these wormholes are arranged in a suitable configuration, a closed time loop is formed.

== Examples ==
For example, an Earth–Moon wormhole whose far end is 0.5 seconds in the "past" will not violate causality, since information sent to the far end via the wormhole and back through normal space will still arrive back on Earth (–0.5 + 1) = 0.5 seconds after it was transmitted; but an additional wormhole in the other direction will allow information to arrive back on Earth 1 second before it was transmitted (time travel). However, it is believed that relative time between the transmission of the information in one wormhole throat and out of the other end in a ring structure will remain the same, because light wouldn't have violated local proper time, because the distance traveled by the information would take time, either by going the long way or through the wormhole.

== Chronology protection ==
Semiclassical approaches to incorporating quantum effects into general relativity seem to show that the chronology protection conjecture postulated by physicist Stephen Hawking fails to prevent the formation of such rings, although Matt Visser feels that there are reasons to think the semiclassical approach is unreliable here, and that a full theory of quantum gravity will likely uphold chronology protection.

== Gallery ==
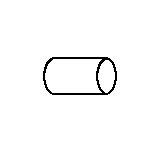
A wormhole with no Closed timelike curves (CTC)

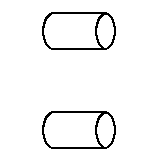
A Roman ring with two wormholes

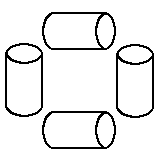
A Roman ring with four wormholes
