= Mike Morris (physicist) =

American theoretical physicist

Michael S. Morris is a professor of physics at Butler University, Indianapolis, Indiana, United States. He earned a PhD in physics from the California Institute of Technology in Pasadena under the supervision of Kip Thorne. Among his nine published peer-reviewed papers, his most notable theoretical contribution is his pioneering analysis of time travel through traversable wormholes, coauthored in 1987 with Kip Thorne, and Ulvi Yurtsever. Kip Thorne tells the story of this discovery in his 1995 book Black Holes and Time Warps: Einstein's Outrageous Legacy.

== Publications ==
- Morris, Michael S. (1989-03-15). "Initial conditions for perturbations in R+εR^{2} cosmology" (PDF). Physical Review D. 39 (6). American Physical Society (APS): 1511–1516. Bibcode:1989PhRvD..39.1511M. doi:10.1103/physrevd.39.1511. ISSN 0556-2821. PMID 9959810.
- Morris, Michael S.; Thorne, Kip S.; Yurtsever, Ulvi (1988-09-26). "Wormholes, Time Machines, and the Weak Energy Condition" (PDF). Physical Review Letters. 61 (13). American Physical Society (APS): 1446–1449. Bibcode:1988PhRvL..61.1446M. doi:10.1103/physrevlett.61.1446. ISSN 0031-9007. PMID 10038800.
- Morris, Michael S.; Thorne, Kip S. (1988). "Wormholes in spacetime and their use for interstellar travel: A tool for teaching general relativity". American Journal of Physics. 56 (5). American Association of Physics Teachers (AAPT): 395–412. Bibcode:1988AmJPh..56..395M. doi:10.1119/1.15620. ISSN 0002-9505. (A tutorial paper)

== See also ==
- Roman arch
