= Time travel =

Hypothetical travel into the past or future

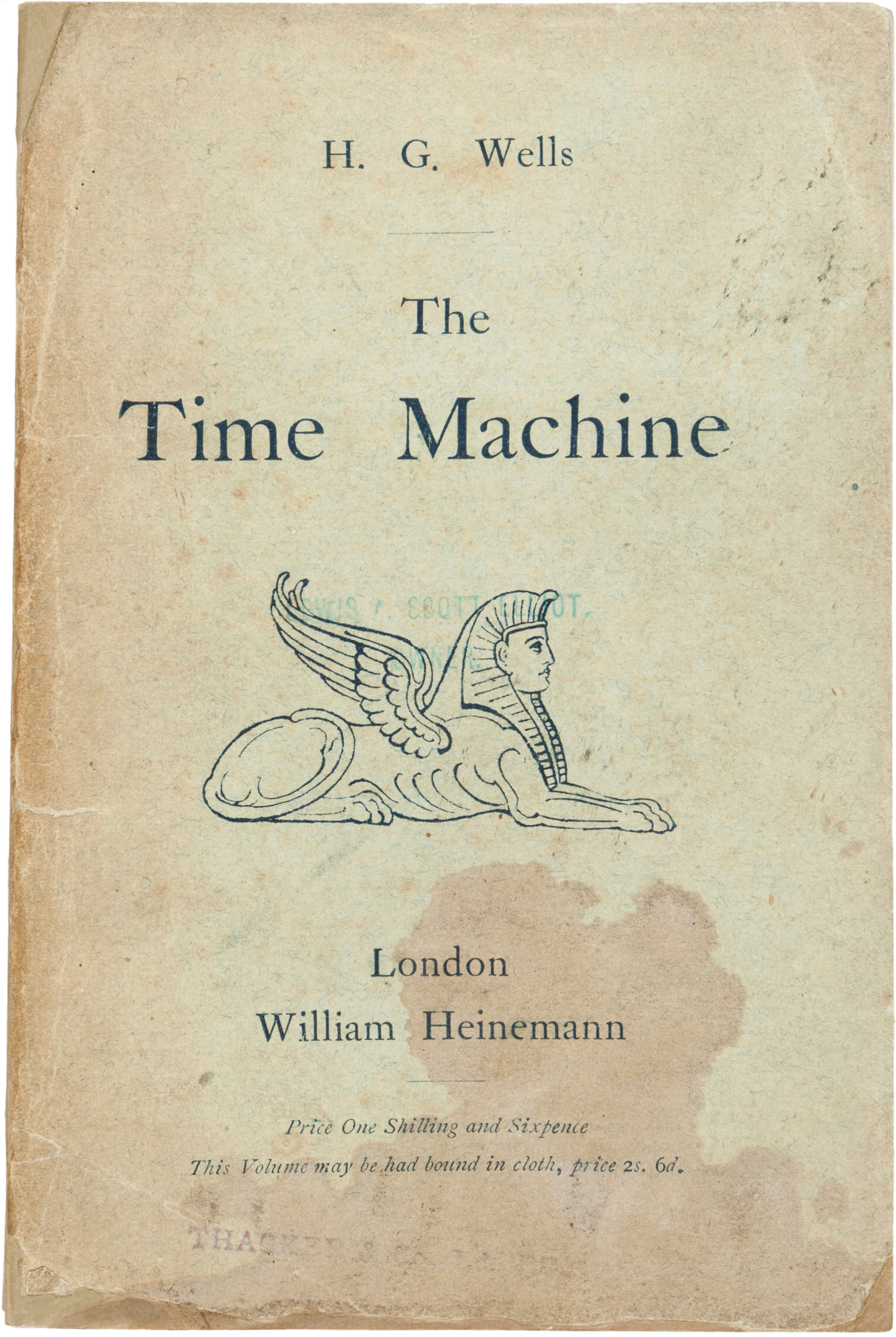
The first page of The Time Machine published by Heinemann

Time travel is the hypothetical activity of traveling into the past or future. Time travel is a concept in philosophy, space, time and fiction, particularly science fiction. In fiction, time travel is typically achieved through the use of a device known as a time machine. The idea of a time machine was popularized by H. G. Wells's 1895 novel The Time Machine.

It is uncertain whether time travel to the past would be physically possible. Such travel, if at all feasible, may give rise to questions of causality. Forward time travel, outside the usual sense of the perception of time, is an extensively observed phenomenon and is well understood within the framework of special relativity and general relativity. However, making one body advance or delay more than a few milliseconds compared to another body is not feasible with current technology. As for backward time travel, it is possible to find solutions in general relativity that allow for it, such as a rotating black hole. Traveling to an arbitrary point in spacetime has very limited support in theoretical physics, and is usually connected only with quantum mechanics or wormholes.

== History of the concept ==
=== In religion, mythology and folklore ===
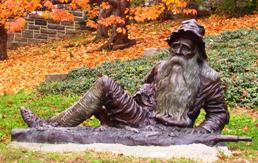
Statue of Rip Van Winkle in Irvington, New York

Some ancient stories feature characters who appear to leap forward in time. The Hindu text of the Vishnu Purana narrates the myth of Raivata Kakudmi, who visits the god Brahma in heaven and returns to Earth to find that many ages have passed. In the Buddhist Pāli Canon, the Payasi Sutta describes how the disciple Kumara Kassapa explains to a skeptic that time flows differently in the heavenly realms. The Japanese legend of "Urashima Tarō", first recorded in the Manyoshu, tells of a fisherman who visits an undersea palace for three days, only to return and find that centuries have passed and that his world is gone.

In one Jewish tradition, Moses is transported by God to the study-hall of Rabbi Akiva, where he is confused by the future evolution of Jewish law. Another Talmudic story features Honi HaMe'agel, a 1st-century BCE miracle-worker who sees a man planting a carob tree that will take 70 years to bear fruit. Honi falls asleep and awakens 70 years later to find the tree fully grown and the man's grandson harvesting its fruit.

Christian and Islamic traditions tell of the Seven Sleepers, a group of monotheistic young men who sought refuge in a cave to escape persecution. As they slept, God preserved them for centuries, and when they awoke, they discovered that the world around them had changed. This narrative, found (for example) in the Quranic Surah Al-Kahf, describes divine protection and time suspension.

=== Science fiction ===
Time travel themes in science fiction and the media can be grouped into three categories: immutable timeline, mutable timeline, and alternate histories, as in the interacting-many-worlds interpretation. The non-scientific term 'timeline' is often used to refer to all physical events in history, so that where events are changed, the time traveler is described as creating a new timeline.

Early science fiction stories feature characters who sleep for years and awaken in a changed society, or are transported to the past through supernatural means. Among them L'An 2440, rêve s'il en fût jamais (The Year 2440: A Dream If Ever There Was One, 1770) by Louis-Sébastien Mercier, Rip Van Winkle (1819) by Washington Irving, Looking Backward (1888) by Edward Bellamy, and When the Sleeper Awakes (1899) by H. G. Wells. Prolonged sleep is used as a means of time travel in these stories.

The date of the earliest work about backwards time travel is uncertain. The Chinese novel A Supplement to the Journey to the West (c. 1640) by Dong Yue features magical mirrors and jade gateways that connect various points in time. The protagonist Sun Wukong travels back in time to the "World of the Ancients" (Qin dynasty) to retrieve a magical bell and then travels forward to the "World of the Future" (Song dynasty) to find an emperor who has been exiled in time. However, the time travel is taking place inside an illusory dream world created by the villain to distract and entrap him. Samuel Madden's Memoirs of the Twentieth Century (1733) is a series of letters from British ambassadors in 1997 and 1998 to diplomats in the past, conveying the political and religious conditions of the future. Because the narrator receives these letters from his guardian angel, Paul Alkon suggests in his book Origins of Futuristic Fiction that "the first time-traveler in English literature is a guardian angel". Madden does not explain how the angel obtains these documents, but Alkon asserts that Madden "deserves recognition as the first to toy with the rich idea of time-travel in the form of an artifact sent backward from the future to be discovered in the present". In the science fiction anthology Far Boundaries (1951), editor August Derleth claims that an early short story about time travel is An Anachronism; or, Missing One's Coach, written for the Dublin Literary Magazine by an anonymous author in the June 1838 issue. While the narrator waits under a tree for a coach to take him out of Newcastle upon Tyne, he is transported back in time over a thousand years. He encounters the Venerable Bede in a monastery and explains to him the developments of the coming centuries. However, the story never makes it clear whether these events are real or a dream. Another early work about time travel is The Forebears of Kalimeros: Alexander, son of Philip of Macedon by Alexander Veltman published in 1836.

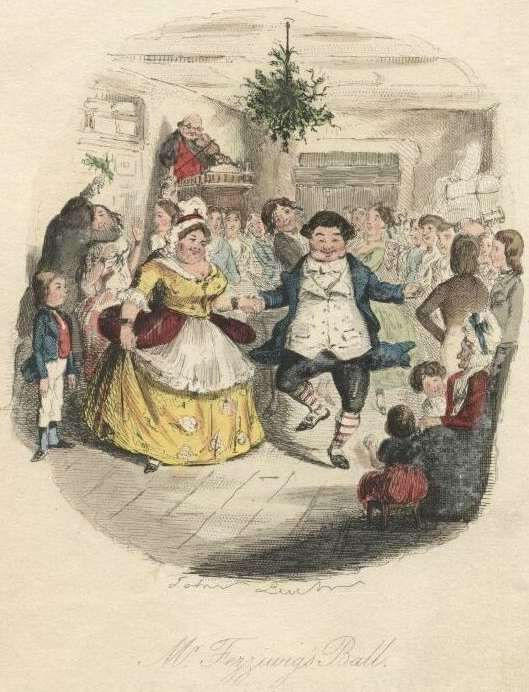
Mr. and Mrs. Fezziwig dance in a vision shown to Scrooge by the Ghost of Christmas Past.

Charles Dickens's A Christmas Carol (1843) has early depictions of mystical time travel in both directions, as the protagonist, Ebenezer Scrooge, is transported to Christmases past and future. Other stories employ the same template, where a character naturally goes to sleep, and upon waking up finds themself in a different time. A clearer example of backward time travel is found in the 1861 book Paris avant les hommes (Paris before Men) by the French botanist and geologist Pierre Boitard, published posthumously. In this story, the protagonist is transported to the prehistoric past by the magic of a "lame demon" (a French pun on Boitard's name), where he encounters a Plesiosaur and an apelike ancestor and is able to interact with ancient creatures. Edward Everett Hale's "Hands Off" (1881) tells the story of an unnamed being, possibly the soul of a person who has recently died, who interferes with ancient Egyptian history by preventing Joseph's enslavement. This may have been the first story to feature an alternate history created as a result of time travel.

In the manga and anime Doraemon, a cat robot was sent from 22nd century future to 20th century past to help the main protagonist Nobita Nobi.

=== Early time machines ===
One of the first stories to feature time travel by means of a machine is "The Clock That Went Backward" by Edward Page Mitchell, which appeared in the New York Sun in 1881. However, the mechanism borders on fantasy. An unusual clock, when wound, runs backwards and transports people nearby back in time. The author does not explain the origin or properties of the clock. Enrique Gaspar y Rimbau's El Anacronópete (1887) may have been the first story to feature a vessel engineered to travel through time. Andrew Sawyer has commented that the story "does seem to be the first literary description of a time machine noted so far", adding that "Edward Page Mitchell's story 'The Clock That Went Backward' (1881) is usually described as the first time-machine story, but I'm not sure that a clock quite counts". H. G. Wells' The Time Machine (1895) popularized the concept of time travel by mechanical means.

== Time travel in physics ==
Some solutions to Einstein's equations for general relativity suggest that suitable geometries of spacetime or specific types of motion in space might allow time travel into the past and future if these geometries or motions were possible. In technical papers, physicists discuss the possibility of closed timelike curves, which are world lines that form closed loops in spacetime, allowing objects to return to their own past. There are known to be solutions to the equations of general relativity that describe spacetimes which contain closed timelike curves, such as Gödel spacetime, but the physical plausibility of these solutions is uncertain.

Any theory that would allow backward time travel would introduce potential problems of causality. The classic example of a problem involving causality is the "grandfather paradox," which postulates travelling to the past and intervening in the conception of one's ancestors (causing the death of an ancestor before conception being frequently cited). Some physicists, such as Novikov and Deutsch, suggested that these sorts of temporal paradoxes can be avoided through the Novikov self-consistency principle or a variation of the many-worlds interpretation with interacting worlds.

=== General relativity ===
Time travel to the past is theoretically possible in certain general relativity spacetime geometries that permit traveling faster than the speed of light, such as cosmic strings, traversable wormholes, and Alcubierre drives. The theory of general relativity does suggest a scientific basis for the possibility of backward time travel in certain unusual scenarios, although arguments from semiclassical gravity suggest that when quantum effects are incorporated into general relativity, these loopholes may be closed. These semiclassical arguments led Stephen Hawking to formulate the chronology protection conjecture, suggesting that the fundamental laws of nature prevent time travel, but physicists cannot come to a definitive judgment on the issue without a theory of quantum gravity to join quantum mechanics and general relativity into a completely unified theory.

==== Different spacetime geometries ====
The theory of general relativity describes the universe under a system of field equations that determine the metric, or distance function, of spacetime. There exist exact solutions to these equations that include closed time-like curves, which are world lines that intersect themselves; some point in the causal future of the world line is also in its causal past, a situation that can be described as time travel. Such a solution was first proposed by Kurt Gödel, a solution known as the Gödel metric, but his (and others') solution requires the universe to have physical characteristics that it does not appear to have, such as rotation and lack of Hubble expansion. Whether general relativity forbids closed time-like curves for all realistic conditions is still being researched.

==== Wormholes ====
Wormholes are a hypothetical warped spacetime permitted by the Einstein field equations of general relativity. A proposed time-travel machine using a traversable wormhole would hypothetically work in the following way: One end of the wormhole is accelerated to some significant fraction of the speed of light, perhaps with some advanced propulsion system, and then brought back to the point of origin. Alternatively, another way is to take one entrance of the wormhole and move it to within the gravitational field of an object that has higher gravity than the other entrance, and then return it to a position near the other entrance. For both these methods, time dilation causes the end of the wormhole that has been moved to have aged less, or become "younger", than the stationary end as seen by an external observer; however, time connects differently through the wormhole than outside it, so that synchronized clocks at either end of the wormhole will always remain synchronized as seen by an observer passing through the wormhole, no matter how the two ends move around. This means that an observer entering the "younger" end would exit the "older" end at a time when it was the same age as the "younger" end, effectively going back in time as seen by an observer from the outside. One significant limitation of such a time machine is that it is only possible to go as far back in time as the initial creation of the machine; in essence, it is more of a path through time than it is a device that itself moves through time, and it would not allow the technology itself to be moved backward in time.

According to current theories on the nature of wormholes, construction of a traversable wormhole would require the existence of a substance with negative energy, often referred to as "exotic matter". More technically, the wormhole spacetime requires a distribution of energy that violates various energy conditions, such as the null energy condition along with the weak, strong, and dominant energy conditions. However, it is known that quantum effects can lead to small measurable violations of the null energy condition, and many physicists believe that the required negative energy may actually be possible due to the Casimir effect in quantum physics. Although early calculations suggested that a very large amount of negative energy would be required, later calculations showed that the amount of negative energy can be made arbitrarily small.

In 1993, Matt Visser argued that the two mouths of a wormhole with such an induced clock difference could not be brought together without inducing quantum field and gravitational effects that would either make the wormhole collapse or the two mouths repel each other. Because of this, the two mouths could not be brought close enough for causality violation to take place. However, in a 1997 paper, Visser hypothesized that a complex "Roman ring" (named after Tom Roman) configuration of an N number of wormholes arranged in a symmetric polygon could still act as a time machine, although he concludes that this is more likely a flaw in classical quantum gravity theory rather than proof that causality violation is possible.

==== Other approaches based on general relativity ====
Another approach involves a dense spinning cylinder usually referred to as a Tipler cylinder, a GR solution discovered by Willem Jacob van Stockum in 1936 and Kornel Lanczos in 1924, but not recognized as allowing closed timelike curves until an analysis by Frank Tipler in 1974. If a cylinder is infinitely long and spins fast enough about its long axis, then a spaceship flying around the cylinder on a spiral path could travel back in time (or forward, depending on the direction of its spiral). However, the density and speed required is so great that ordinary matter is not strong enough to construct it.

A more fundamental objection to time travel schemes based on rotating cylinders or cosmic strings has been put forward by Stephen Hawking, who proved a theorem showing that according to general relativity it is impossible to build a time machine of a special type (a "time machine with the compactly generated Cauchy horizon") in a region where the weak energy condition is satisfied, meaning that the region contains no matter with negative energy density (exotic matter). Solutions such as Tipler's assume cylinders of infinite length, which are easier to analyze mathematically, and although Tipler suggested that a finite cylinder might produce closed timelike curves if the rotation rate were fast enough, he did not prove this. But Hawking points out that because of his theorem, "it can't be done with positive energy density everywhere! I can prove that to build a finite time machine, you need negative energy." This result comes from Hawking's 1992 paper on the chronology protection conjecture, which Hawking states as "The laws of physics do not allow the appearance of closed timelike curves."

=== Quantum physics ===
==== No-communication theorem ====
When a signal is sent from one location and received at another location, then as long as the signal is moving at the speed of light or slower, the mathematics of simultaneity in the theory of relativity show that all reference frames agree that the transmission-event happened before the reception-event. When the signal travels faster than light, it is received before it is sent, in all reference frames. The signal could be said to have moved backward in time. This hypothetical scenario is sometimes referred to as a tachyonic antitelephone.

Quantum-mechanical phenomena such as quantum teleportation, the EPR paradox, or quantum entanglement might appear to create a mechanism that allows for faster-than-light (FTL) communication or time travel, and in fact some interpretations of quantum mechanics such as the Bohm interpretation presume that some information is being exchanged between particles instantaneously in order to maintain correlations between particles. This effect was referred to as "spooky action at a distance" by Einstein.

Nevertheless, the fact that causality is preserved in quantum mechanics is a rigorous result in modern quantum field theories, and therefore modern theories do not allow for time travel or FTL communication. In any specific instance where FTL has been claimed, more detailed analysis has proven that to get a signal, some form of classical communication must also be used. The no-communication theorem also gives a general proof that quantum entanglement cannot be used to transmit information faster than classical signals.

==== Interacting many-worlds interpretation ====
A variation of Hugh Everett's many-worlds interpretation (MWI) of quantum mechanics provides a resolution to the grandfather paradox that involves the time traveler arriving in a different universe than the one they came from; it's been argued that since the traveler arrives in a different universe's history and not their own history, this is not "genuine" time travel. The accepted many-worlds interpretation suggests that all possible quantum events can occur in mutually exclusive histories. However, some variations allow different universes to interact. This concept is most often used in science-fiction, but some physicists such as David Deutsch have suggested that a time traveler should end up in a different history than the one he started from. On the other hand, Stephen Hawking has argued that even if the MWI is correct, we should expect each time traveler to experience a single self-consistent history, so that time travelers remain within their own world rather than traveling to a different one. The physicist Allen Everett argued that Deutsch's approach "involves modifying fundamental principles of quantum mechanics; it certainly goes beyond simply adopting the MWI". Everett also argues that even if Deutsch's approach is correct, it would imply that any macroscopic object composed of multiple particles would be split apart when traveling back in time through a wormhole, with different particles emerging in different worlds.

=== Experimental results ===
Certain experiments carried out give the impression of reversed causality, but fail to show it under closer examination.

The delayed-choice quantum eraser experiment performed by Marlan Scully involves pairs of entangled photons that are divided into "signal photons" and "idler photons", with the signal photons emerging from one of two locations and their position later measured as in the double-slit experiment. Depending on how the idler photon is measured, the experimenter can either learn which of the two locations the signal photon emerged from or "erase" that information. Even though the signal photons can be measured before the choice has been made about the idler photons, the choice seems to retroactively determine whether or not an interference pattern is observed when one correlates measurements of idler photons to the corresponding signal photons. However, since interference can be observed only after the idler photons are measured and they are correlated with the signal photons, there is no way for experimenters to tell what choice will be made in advance just by looking at the signal photons, only by gathering classical information from the entire system; thus causality is preserved.

The experiment of Lijun Wang might also show causality violation since it made it possible to send packages of waves through a bulb of caesium gas in such a way that the package appeared to exit the bulb 62 nanoseconds before its entry, but a wave package is not a single well-defined object but rather a sum of multiple waves of different frequencies (see Fourier analysis), and the package can appear to move faster than light or even backward in time even if none of the pure waves in the sum do so. This effect cannot be used to send any matter, energy, or information faster than light, so this experiment is understood not to violate causality either.

The physicists Günter Nimtz and Alfons Stahlhofen, of the University of Koblenz, claim to have violated Einstein's theory of relativity by transmitting photons faster than the speed of light. They say they have conducted an experiment in which microwave photons traveled "instantaneously" between a pair of prisms that had been moved up to 3 ft (0.91 m) apart, using a phenomenon known as quantum tunneling. Nimtz told New Scientist magazine: "For the time being, this is the only violation of special relativity that I know of." However, other physicists say that this phenomenon does not allow information to be transmitted faster than light. Aephraim M. Steinberg, a quantum optics expert at the University of Toronto, Canada, uses the analogy of a train traveling from Chicago to New York, but dropping off train cars at each station along the way, so that the center of the train moves forward at each stop; in this way, the speed of the center of the train exceeds the speed of any of the individual cars.

Shengwang Du claims in a peer-reviewed journal to have observed single photons' precursors, saying that they travel no faster than c in a vacuum. His experiment involved slow light as well as passing light through a vacuum. He generated two single photons, passing one through rubidium atoms that had been cooled with a laser (thus slowing the light) and passing one through a vacuum. Both times, apparently, the precursors preceded the photons' main bodies, and the precursor traveled at c in a vacuum. According to Du, this implies that there is no possibility of light traveling faster than c and, thus, no possibility of violating causality.

=== Absence of time travelers from the future ===
Many have argued that the absence of time travelers from the future demonstrates that such technology will never be developed, suggesting that it is impossible. This is analogous to the Fermi paradox related to the absence of evidence of extraterrestrial life. As the absence of extraterrestrial visitors does not categorically prove they do not exist, so the absence of time travelers fails to prove time travel is physically impossible; it might be that time travel is physically possible but is never developed or is cautiously used. Carl Sagan once suggested the possibility that time travelers could be here but are disguising their existence or are not recognized as time travelers. Some interpretations of general relativity propose that time travel could only occur within specific conditions such as regions of spacetime affected by extreme gravitational fields or other distortions. In such scenarios, time travelers would be limited to moving within the period after such a region came into existence, and could not travel to a time before it formed. Stephen Hawking stated that this would explain why the world has not already been overrun by "tourists from the future".

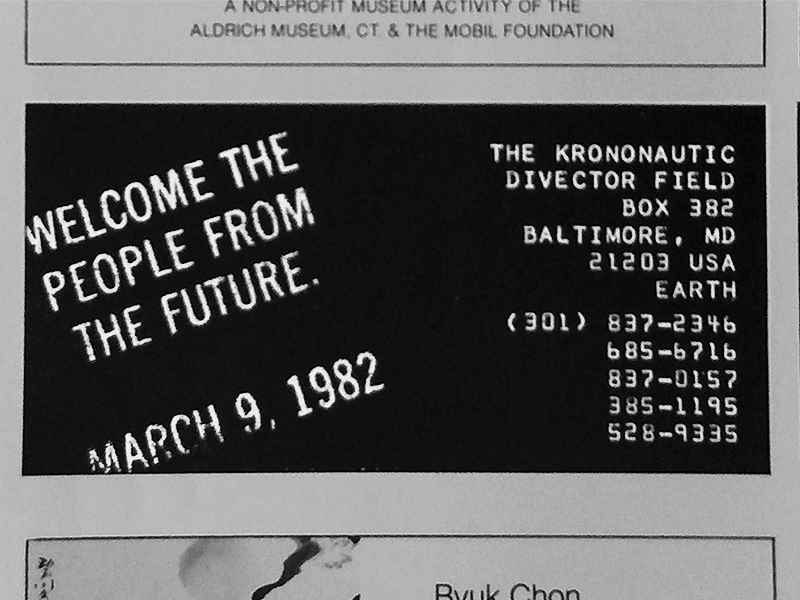
Advertisement placed in a 1980 edition of Artforum, advertising the Krononauts event

Several experiments have been carried out to try to entice future humans, who might invent time travel technology, to come back and demonstrate it to people of the present time. Events such as Perth's Destination Day, MIT's Time Traveler Convention and Stephen Hawking's Reception For Time Travellers heavily publicized permanent "advertisements" of a meeting time and place for future time travelers to meet. In 1982, a group in Baltimore, Maryland, identifying itself as the Krononauts, hosted an event of this type welcoming visitors from the future.

These experiments only stood the possibility of generating a positive result demonstrating the existence of time travel, but have failed so far—no time travelers are known to have attended either event. Some versions of the many-worlds interpretation can be used to suggest that future humans have traveled back in time, but have traveled back to the meeting time and place in a parallel universe.

== Time dilation ==
Transversal time dilation. The blue dots represent a pulse of light. Each pair of dots with light "bouncing" between them is a clock. For each group of clocks, the other group appears to be ticking more slowly, because the moving clock's light pulse has to travel a larger distance than the stationary clock's light pulse. That is so, even though the clocks are identical and their relative motion is perfectly reciprocal.

There is a great deal of observable evidence for time dilation in special relativity and gravitational time dilation in general relativity, for example in the famous and easy-to-replicate observation of atmospheric muon decay. The theory of relativity is based on the observation that the speed of light is invariant for all observers in any frame of reference; that is, it is always the same. Time dilation is a direct consequence of the invariance of the speed of light. Time dilation can be observed for objects by traveling at relativistic speeds or through the effects of gravity.

Time dilation allows time travel into the future assuming the ability to accelerate to speeds close to the speed of light. If a spacecraft could be accelerated to 99.995% of the speed of light, travel forward for 500 years, then reverse course and return to Earth at the same speed, the time on Earth will be 1000 years in the future, but the traveler will only experience a time difference of 10 years. With current technologies, it is only possible to cause a human traveler to age less than companions on Earth by a few milliseconds after a few hundred days of space travel.

This effect is also responsible for the twin paradox. In the twin paradox one twin remains on Earth, while the other accelerates to relativistic speed as they travel into space, turns around, and travels back to Earth. The traveling twin ages less than the twin who stayed on Earth, because of the moving clock covers the same spacetime distance partly in space while the stationary clock covers it all with time alone.

General relativity treats the effects of acceleration and the effects of gravity as equivalent, and shows that time dilation also occurs in gravity wells, with a clock deeper in the well ticking more slowly; this effect is taken into account when calibrating the clocks on the satellites of the Global Positioning System, and it could lead to significant differences in rates of aging for observers at different distances from a large gravity well such as a black hole.

A time machine that utilizes this principle might be, for instance, a spherical shell with a diameter of five meters and the mass of Jupiter. A person at its center will travel forward in time at a rate four times slower than that of distant observers. Squeezing the mass of a large planet into such a small structure is not expected to be within humanity's technological capabilities in the near future.

== Philosophy ==
Philosophers have discussed the philosophy of space and time since at least the time of ancient Greece; for example, Parmenides presented the view that time is an illusion. Centuries later, Isaac Newton supported the idea of absolute time, while his contemporary Gottfried Wilhelm Leibniz maintained that time is only a relation between events and it cannot be expressed independently. The latter approach eventually gave rise to the spacetime of relativity.

=== Presentism vs. eternalism ===
Many philosophers have argued that relativity implies eternalism, the idea that the past and future exist in a real sense, not only as changes that occurred or will occur to the present. Philosopher of science Dean Rickles disagrees with some qualifications, but notes that "the consensus among philosophers seems to be that special and general relativity are incompatible with presentism". Some philosophers view time as a dimension equal to spatial dimensions, that future events are "already there" in the same sense different places exist, and that there is no objective flow of time; however, this view is disputed.

Presentism is a school of philosophy that holds that the future and the past exist only as changes that occurred or will occur to the present, and they have no real existence of their own. In this view, time travel is impossible because there is no future or past to travel to. Keller and Nelson have argued that even if past and future objects do not exist, there can still be definite truths about past and future events, and thus it is possible that a future truth about a time traveler deciding to travel back to the present date could explain the time traveler's actual appearance in the present; these views are contested by some authors.

=== The grandfather paradox ===
A common objection to the idea of traveling back in time is put forth in the grandfather paradox or the argument of auto-infanticide. If one were able to go back in time, inconsistencies and contradictions would ensue if the time traveler were to change anything; there is a contradiction if the past becomes different from the way it is. The paradox is commonly described with a person who travels to the past and kills their own grandfather, prevents the existence of their father or mother, and therefore their own existence. Philosophers question whether these paradoxes prove time travel impossible. Some philosophers answer these paradoxes by arguing that it might be the case that backward time travel could be possible but that it would be impossible to actually change the past in any way, an idea similar to the proposed Novikov self-consistency principle in physics.

=== Ontological paradox ===
==== Compossibility ====
According to the philosophical theory of compossibility, what can happen, for example in the context of time travel, must be weighed against the context of everything relating to the situation. If the past is a certain way, it's not possible for it to be any other way. What can happen when a time traveler visits the past is limited to what did happen, in order to prevent logical contradictions.

==== Self-consistency principle ====
The Novikov self-consistency principle, named after Igor Dmitrievich Novikov, states that any actions taken by a time traveler or by an object that travels back in time were part of history all along, and therefore it is impossible for the time traveler to "change" history in any way. The time traveler's actions may be the cause of events in their own past though, which leads to the potential for circular causation, sometimes called a predestination paradox, ontological paradox, or bootstrap paradox. The term bootstrap paradox was popularized by Robert A. Heinlein's story "By His Bootstraps". The Novikov self-consistency principle proposes that the local laws of physics in a region of spacetime containing time travelers cannot be any different from the local laws of physics in any other region of spacetime.

The philosopher Kelley L. Ross argues in "Time Travel Paradoxes" that in a scenario involving a physical object whose world-line or history forms a closed loop in time there can be a violation of the second law of thermodynamics. Ross uses the film Somewhere in Time as an example of such an ontological paradox, where a watch is given to a person, and 60 years later the same watch is brought back in time and given to the same character. Ross states that entropy of the watch will increase, and the watch carried back in time will be more worn with each repetition of its history. The second law of thermodynamics is understood by modern physicists to be a statistical law, so decreasing entropy and non-increasing entropy are not impossible, just improbable. Additionally, entropy statistically increases in systems which are isolated, so non-isolated systems, such as an object, that interact with the outside world, can become less worn and decrease in entropy, and it's possible for an object whose world-line forms a closed loop to be always in the same condition in the same point of its history.

In 2005, Daniel Greenberger and Karl Svozil proposed that quantum theory gives a model for time travel where the past must be self-consistent.

== See also ==
Claims of time travel

- Time travel claims and urban legends
- Parapsychology

Culture

- Time capsule

Fiction

- Time travel in fiction
- List of time travel works of fiction
- Time viewer

Meetings

- Time Traveler Convention
- Hawking's time traveller party

Science

- Krasnikov tube
- Retrocausality
- Ring singularity
- Temporal paradox
- Wheeler–Feynman absorber theory

Time perception

- Cryonics
- Suspended animation
- Time perception
