= Willem Jacob van Stockum =

Dutch mathematician (1910–1944)

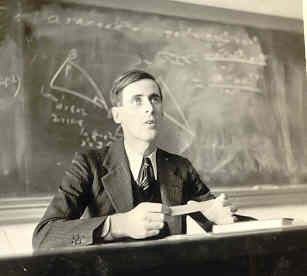
Van Stockum, Toronto, c. 1935.

Willem Jacob van Stockum (20 November 1910 – 10 June 1944) was a Dutch mathematician who made an important contribution to the early development of general relativity.

== Biography ==
Van Stockum was born in Hattem in the Netherlands. His father was a mechanically talented officer in the Dutch Navy. After the family (less the father) relocated to Ireland in the late 1920s, Willem studied mathematics at Trinity College, Dublin, where he earned a gold medal. He went on to earn an M.A. from the University of Toronto and his Ph.D. from the University of Edinburgh in 1937.

In the mid-1930s, van Stockum became an early enthusiast of the then new theory of gravitation, general relativity. In 1938, he published a paper which contains one of the first exact solutions in general relativity which modeled the gravitational field produced by a configuration of rotating matter, the van Stockum dust, which remains an important example noted for its unusual simplicity. In this paper, van Stockum was apparently the first to notice the possibility of closed timelike curves, one of the strangest and most disconcerting phenomena in general relativity.

Van Stockum left for the United States in hope of studying under Albert Einstein, eventually in the spring of 1939 gaining a temporary position under Professor Oswald Veblen at the Institute for Advanced Study in Princeton. The outbreak of the Second World War occurred while he was teaching at the University of Maryland. Anxious to join the fight against Hitler, he enlisted in the Royal Canadian Air Force, eventually earning his pilots wings in July 1942. Because of his advanced knowledge of physics, he spent much of the next year as a test pilot in Canada. After the Netherlands was invaded by Hitler, van Stockum sought to join the war as a pilot. Finally, he was able to transfer to the Dutch Air Force (in exile), and in 1944 became the only Dutch officer posted to No. 10 Sqron of the RAF Bomber Command, which was stationed in Yorkshire and flew combat missions in the Halifax heavy bomber over Europe before and after the Normandy invasion. On 10 June 1944, van Stockum and his crew of six took off on their sixth combat mission, as part of another 400-plane raid. Near their target, the plane was hit by flak, and all seven crew members were lost, along with seven from another bomber on the same mission. The fourteen airmen are buried in Laval, near the place where the planes went down.

== Literature ==
=== By van Stockum ===
- van Stockum, W. J. (1937). Axially symmetric gravitational fields. University of Edinburgh. OCLC 1064448393. Doctoral thesis Edinburgh.
- van Stockum, W. J. (1938). "IX.-The gravitational field of a distribution of particles rotating around an axis of symmetry". Proc. R. Soc. Edinburgh. 57. Cambridge University Press: 135–154. doi:10.1017/S0370164600013699. The original paper presenting the rediscovery of Lanczos' 1924 dust solution, nowadays referred to as the Lanczos-van Stockum solution.
- van Stockum, Willem Jacob (December 1944). "A SOLDIER'S CREED By A BOMBER PILOT". cgoakley.org. Essay written by van Stockum published under the byline "a bomber pilot", due to wartime security restrictions.

=== By others ===
- Beenakker, Carlo (2004). "Time travel pioneer". ilorentz.org. Lorentz Institute for theoretical physics, Leiden University.
- Lanczos, K. (Kornel) (1997). "On a Stationary Cosmology in the Sense of Einstein's Theory of Gravitation". General Relativity and Gravitation. 29 (3): 363–399. doi:10.1023/A:1010277120072. Translated reprint of Lanczos, Kornel (1924). "Über eine stationäre Kosmologie im Sinne der Einsteinschen Gravitationstheorie". Zeitschrift für Physik (in German). 21 (1). Springer Science and Business Media LLC: 73–110. Bibcode:1924ZPhy...21...73L. doi:10.1007/bf01328251. ISSN 1434-6001. S2CID 122902359. Van Stockum rediscovered Lanczos's result.
- van Loo, Erwin (June 2004). "Willem Jacob van Stockum: A scientist in uniform". lorentz.leidenuniv.nl. Translated by Beenakker, Carlo. Translation of an article by a historian published in the Dutch Air Force magazine "De Vliegende Hollander".
- Wack, Robert P. (2014). Time Bomber. New York: Boissevain Books. ISBN 9780984523283. Historical fiction by Robert P. Wack, set in Normandy in June 1944. Van Stockum's life and work inspired this book. Also available as Wack, Robert P. (May 10, 2014). Time Bomber. Boissevain Books. ISBN 978-0984523283.
