= Closed timelike curve =

World line of a particle in spacetime which returns to its starting point

In mathematical physics, a closed timelike curve (CTC) is a world line in a Lorentzian manifold, of a material particle in spacetime, that is "closed", returning to its starting point. This possibility was first discovered by Willem Jacob van Stockum in 1937 and later confirmed by Kurt Gödel in 1949, who discovered a solution to the equations of general relativity (GR) allowing CTCs known as the Gödel metric, and since then other GR solutions containing CTCs have been found, such as the Tipler cylinder and traversable wormholes. If CTCs exist, their existence would seem to imply at least the theoretical possibility of time travel backwards in time, raising the spectre of the grandfather paradox, although the Novikov self-consistency principle seems to show that such paradoxes could be avoided. Some physicists speculate that the CTCs which appear in certain GR solutions might be ruled out by a future theory of quantum gravity which would replace GR, an idea which Stephen Hawking labeled the chronology protection conjecture. Others note that if every closed timelike curve in a given spacetime passes through an event horizon, a property which can be called chronological censorship, then that spacetime with event horizons excised would still be causally well behaved and an observer might not be able to detect the causal violation.

== Light cones ==
The lower light cone is characteristic of light cones in flat space—all spacetime coordinates included in the light cone have later times. The upper light cone not only includes other spatial locations at the same time, but also does not include $x=0$ at future times, and includes earlier times.

When discussing the evolution of a system in general relativity, or more specifically Minkowski space, physicists often refer to a "light cone". A light cone represents any possible future evolution of an object given its current state, or every possible location given its current location. An object's possible future locations are limited by the speed that the object can move, which is at best the speed of light. For instance, an object located at position p at time t_{0} can only move to locations within p + c(t_{1} − t_{0}) by time t_{1}.

This is commonly represented on a graph with physical locations along the horizontal axis and time running vertically, with units of $t$ for time and ct for space. Light cones in this representation appear as lines at 45 degrees centered on the object, as light travels at $ct$ per $t$. On such a diagram, every possible future location of the object lies within the cone. Additionally, every space location has a future time, implying that an object may stay at any location in space indefinitely.

Any single point on such a diagram is known as an event. Separate events are considered to be timewise separated if they differ along the time axis, or spacewise separated if they differ along the space axis. An object at rest in this frame of reference travels up the t-axis; if it has velocity or acceleration, it moves across the x axis as well. The actual path an object takes through spacetime, as opposed to the ones it could take, is known as the worldline. Another definition is that the light cone represents all possible worldlines.

In "simple" examples of spacetime metrics the light cone is directed forward in time. This corresponds to the common case that an object cannot be in two places at once, or alternately that it cannot move instantly to another location. In these spacetimes, the worldlines of physical objects are, by definition, timewise. However this orientation is only true of "locally flat" spacetimes. In curved spacetimes the light cone will be "tilted" along the spacetime's geodesic. For instance, while moving in the vicinity of a star, the star's gravity will "pull" on the object, affecting its worldline, so its possible future positions lie closer to the star. This appears as a slightly tilted lightcone on the corresponding spacetime diagram. An object in free fall in this circumstance continues to move along its local $t$ axis, but to an external observer it appears it is accelerating in space as well—a common situation if the object is in orbit, for instance.

In extreme examples, in spacetimes with suitably high-curvature metrics, the light cone can be tilted beyond 45 degrees. That means there are potential "future" positions, from the object's frame of reference, that are spacelike separated to observers in an external rest frame. From this outside viewpoint, the object can move instantaneously through space. In these situations the object would have to move, since its present spatial location would not be in its own future light cone. Additionally, with enough of a tilt, there are event locations that lie in the "past" as seen from the outside. With a suitable movement of what appears to it its own space axis, the object appears to travel through time as seen externally.

A closed timelike curve can be created if a series of such light cones are set up so as to loop back on themselves, so it would be possible for an object to move around this loop and return to the same place and time that it started. An object in such an orbit would repeatedly return to the same point in spacetime if it stays in free fall. Returning to the original spacetime location would be only one possibility; the object's future light cone would include spacetime points both forwards and backwards in time, and so it should be possible for the object to engage in time travel under these conditions.

== General relativity ==
CTCs appear in locally unobjectionable exact solutions to the Einstein field equation of general relativity, including some of the most important solutions. These include:

- the Misner space (which is Minkowski space orbifolded by a discrete boost)
- the Kerr vacuum (which models a rotating uncharged black hole)
- the interior of a rotating BTZ black hole
- the van Stockum dust (which models a cylindrically symmetric configuration of dust)
- the Gödel lambda dust (which models a dust with a carefully chosen cosmological constant term)
- the Tipler cylinder (a cylindrically symmetric metric with CTCs)
- Bonnor-Steadman solutions describing laboratory situations such as two spinning balls
- J. Richard Gott has proposed a mechanism for creating CTCs using cosmic strings.

Some of these examples are, like the Tipler cylinder, rather artificial, but the exterior part of the Kerr solution is thought to be in some sense generic, so it is rather unnerving to learn that its interior contains CTCs. Most physicists feel that CTCs in such solutions are artifacts.

== Consequences ==
One feature of a CTC is that it opens the possibility of a worldline which is not connected to earlier times, and so the existence of events that cannot be traced to an earlier cause. Ordinarily, causality demands that each event in spacetime is preceded by its cause in every rest frame. This principle is critical in determinism, which in the language of general relativity states complete knowledge of the universe on a spacelike Cauchy surface can be used to calculate the complete state of the rest of spacetime. However, in a CTC, causality breaks down, because an event can be "simultaneous" with its cause—in some sense an event may be able to cause itself. It is impossible to determine based only on knowledge of the past whether or not something exists in the CTC that can interfere with other objects in spacetime. A CTC therefore results in a Cauchy horizon, and a region of spacetime that cannot be predicted from perfect knowledge of some past time.

No CTC can be continuously deformed as a CTC to a point (that is, a CTC and a point are not timelike homotopic), as the manifold would not be causally well behaved at that point. The topological feature which prevents the CTC from being deformed to a point is known as a timelike topological feature.

The existence of CTCs would arguably place restrictions on physically allowable states of matter-energy fields in the universe. Propagating a field configuration along the family of closed timelike worldlines must, according to such arguments, eventually result in the state that is identical to the original one. This idea has been explored by some scientists as a possible approach towards disproving the existence of CTCs.

While quantum formulations of CTCs have been proposed, a strong challenge to them is their ability to freely create entanglement, which quantum theory predicts is impossible. If Deutsch's prescription holds, the existence of these CTCs implies also equivalence of quantum and classical computation (both in PSPACE). If Lloyd's prescription holds, quantum computations would be PP-complete.

== Contractible versus noncontractible ==
There are two classes of CTCs. We have CTCs contractible to a point (if we no longer insist it has to be future-directed timelike everywhere), and we have CTCs which are not contractible. For the latter, we can always go to the universal covering space, and reestablish causality. For the former, such a procedure is not possible. No closed timelike curve is contractible to a point by a timelike homotopy among timelike curves, as that point would not be causally well behaved.

== Cauchy horizon ==
The chronology violating set is the set of points through which CTCs pass. The boundary of this set is the Cauchy horizon. The Cauchy horizon is generated by closed null geodesics. Associated with each closed null geodesic is a redshift factor describing the rescaling of the rate of change of the affine parameter around a loop. Because of this redshift factor, the affine parameter terminates at a finite value after infinitely many revolutions because the geometric series converges.

== See also ==
- Causal structure
- Causality conditions
- Quantum mechanics of time travel
- Roman ring
- Time crystal
- Timelike
- Poincaré recurrence theorem
