= Gödel metric =

Solution of Einstein field equations

The Gödel metric, also known as the Gödel solution or Gödel universe, is an exact solution, found in 1949 by Kurt Gödel, of the Einstein field equations in which the stress–energy tensor contains two terms: the first representing the matter density of a homogeneous distribution of swirling dust particles (see Dust solution), and the second associated with a negative cosmological constant (see Lambdavacuum solution).

This solution has many unusual properties—in particular, the existence of closed time-like curves that would allow time travel in a universe described by the solution. Its definition is somewhat artificial, since the value of the cosmological constant must be carefully chosen to correspond to the density of the dust grains, but this spacetime is an important pedagogical example.

== Definition ==
Like any other Lorentzian spacetime, the Gödel solution represents the metric tensor in terms of a local coordinate chart. It may be easiest to understand the Gödel universe using the cylindrical coordinate system (see below), but this article uses the chart originally used by Gödel. In this chart, the metric (or, equivalently, the line element) is

$$g = \frac{1}{2\omega^2} \left[ -(dt + e^x \, dy)^2 + dx^2 + \tfrac{1}{2} e^{2x} \, dy^2 +dz^2\right]$$

where $\omega$ is a non-zero real constant that gives the angular velocity of the surrounding dust grains about the y-axis, measured by a "non-spinning" observer riding on one of the dust grains. "Non-spinning" means that the observer does not feel centrifugal forces, but in this coordinate system, it would rotate about an axis parallel to the y-axis. In this rotating frame, the dust grains remain at constant values of x, y, and z. Their density in this coordinate diagram increases with x, but their density in their own frames of reference is the same everywhere.

== Properties ==
To investigate the properties of the Gödel solution, the frame field can be assumed (dual to the co-frame read from the metric as given above),

$$\vec{e}_0 = \sqrt{2} \omega \, \partial_t$$
$$\vec{e}_1 = \sqrt{2} \omega \, \partial_x$$
$$\vec{e}_2 = \sqrt{2} \omega \, \partial_y$$
$$\vec{e}_3 = 2 \omega \, \left( \exp(-x) \, \partial_z - \partial_t \right).$$

This framework defines a family of inertial observers that are 'comoving with the dust grains'. The computation of the Fermi–Walker derivatives with respect to $\vec{e}_0$ shows that the spatial frames are spinning about $\vec{e}_2$ with the angular velocity $-\omega$. It follows that the 'non spinning inertial frame' comoving with the dust particles is

$$\vec{f}_0 = \vec{e}_0$$
$$\vec{f}_1 = \cos(\omega t) \, \vec{e}_1 - \sin(\omega t) \, \vec{e}_3$$
$$\vec{f}_2 = \vec{e}_2$$
$$\vec{f}_3 = \sin(\omega t) \, \vec{e}_1 + \cos(\omega t) \, \vec{e}_3.$$

=== Einstein tensor ===
The components of the Einstein tensor (with respect to either frame above) are

$$G^{\hat{a}\hat{b}} = \omega^2 \operatorname{diag} (-1,1,1,1) + 2 \omega^2 \operatorname{diag} (1,0,0,0).$$

Here, the first term is characteristic of a Lambdavacuum solution and the second term is characteristic of a pressureless perfect fluid or dust solution. The cosmological constant is carefully chosen to partially cancel the matter density of the dust.

=== Topology ===
The Gödel spacetime is a rare example of a regular (singularity-free) solution of the Einstein field equations. Gödel's original chart is geodesically complete and free of singularities. Therefore, it is a global chart, and the spacetime is homeomorphic to R^{4}, and therefore, simply connected.

=== Curvature invariants ===
In any Lorentzian spacetime, the fourth rank Riemann tensor is a multilinear operator on the four-dimensional space of tangent vectors (at some event), but a linear operator on the six-dimensional space of bivectors at that event. Accordingly, it has a characteristic polynomial, whose roots are the eigenvalues. In Gödelian spacetime, these eigenvalues are very simple:

- triple eigenvalue zero,
- double eigenvalue $-\omega^2$,
- single eigenvalue $\omega^2$.

=== Killing vectors ===
This spacetime admits a five-dimensional Lie algebra of Killing vectors, which can be generated by 'time translation' $\partial_t$, two 'spatial translations' $\partial_y, \; \partial_z$, plus two further Killing vector fields:

$$\partial_x - y \, \partial_y$$

and

$$-2 \exp(-x) \, \partial_t + y \, \partial_x + \left( \exp(-2x) -y^2/2 \right) \, \partial_y.$$

The isometry group acts 'transitively' (since we can translate into $t,y,z$, and with the fourth vector we can move along $x$), so spacetime is 'homogeneous'. However, it is not 'isotropic', as can be seen.

The given demonstrators show that the slices $x=x_0$ admit a transitive abelian three-dimensional transformation group, so that a quotient of the solution can be reinterpreted as a stationary cylindrically symmetric solution. The slices $y=y_0$ allow for an SL(2,R) action, and the slices $t=t_0$ admit a Bianchi III (cf. the fourth Killing vector field). This can be rewritten as the symmetry group containing three-dimensional subgroups with examples of Bianchi types I, III, and VIII. Four of the five Killing vectors, as well as the curvature tensor do not depend on the coordinate y. The Gödel solution is the Cartesian product of a factor R with a three-dimensional Lorentzian manifold (signature −++).

It can be shown that, except for the local isometry, the Gödel solution is the only perfect fluid solution of the Einstein field equation which admits a five-dimensional Lie algebra of the Killing vectors.

=== Petrov type and Bel decomposition ===
The Weyl tensor of the Gödel solution has Petrov type D. This means that for an appropriately chosen observer, the tidal forces are very close to those that would be felt from a point mass in Newtonian gravity.

To study the tidal forces in more detail, the Bel decomposition of the Riemann tensor can be computed into three pieces, the tidal or electrogravitic tensor (which represents tidal forces), the magnetogravitic tensor (which represents spin-spin forces on spinning test particles and other gravitational effects analogous to magnetism), and the topogravitic tensor (which represents the spatial sectional curvatures).

Observers comoving with the dust particles would observe that the tidal tensor (with respect to $\vec{u} = \vec{e}_0$, which components evaluated in our frame) has the form

$${E\left[ \vec{u} \right]}_{\hat{m}\hat{n}} = \omega^2 \operatorname{diag}(1,0,1).$$

That is, they measure isotropic tidal tension orthogonal to the distinguished direction $\partial_y$.

The gravitomagnetic tensor vanishes identically

$${B\left[ \vec{u} \right]}_{\hat{m}\hat{n}} = 0.$$

This is an artifact of the unusual symmetries of this spacetime, and implies that the putative "rotation" of the dust does not have the gravitomagnetic effects usually associated with the gravitational field produced by rotating matter.

The principal Lorentz invariants of the Riemann tensor are

$$R_{abcd} \, R^{abcd} = 12 \omega^4, \; R_{abcd} {{}^\star R}^{abcd} = 0.$$

The vanishing of the second invariant means that some observers measure no gravitomagnetism, which is consistent with what was just said. The fact that the first invariant (the Kretschmann invariant) is constant reflects the homogeneity of the Gödel spacetime.

=== Rigid rotation ===
The frame fields given above are both inertial, $\nabla_{\vec{e}_0} \vec{e}_0 = 0$, but the vorticity vector of the timelike geodesic congruence defined by the timelike unit vectors is

$$-\omega \vec{e}_2$$

This means that the world lines of nearby dust particles are twisting about one another. Furthermore, the shear tensor of the congruence $\vec{e}_0$ vanishes, so the dust particles exhibit rigid rotation.

=== Optical effects ===
If the past light cone of a given observer is studied, it can be found that null geodesics moving orthogonally to $\partial_y$ spiral inwards toward the observer, so that if one looks radially, one sees the other dust grains in progressively time-lagged positions. However, the solution is stationary, so it might seem that an observer riding on a dust grain will not see the other grains rotating about oneself. However, recall that while the first frame given above (the $\vec{e}_j$) appears static in the chart, the Fermi–Walker derivatives show that it is spinning with respect to gyroscopes. The second frame (the $\vec{f}_j$) appears to be spinning in the chart, but it is gyrostabilized, and a non-spinning inertial observer riding on a dust grain will indeed see the other dust grains rotating clockwise with angular velocity $\omega$ about his axis of symmetry. It turns out that in addition, optical images are expanded and sheared in the direction of rotation.

If a non-spinning inertial observer looks along his axis of symmetry, one sees one's coaxial non-spinning inertial peers apparently non-spinning with respect to oneself, as would be expected.

=== Shape of absolute future ===
According to Hawking and Ellis, another remarkable feature of this spacetime is the fact that, if the inessential y coordinate is suppressed, light emitted from an event on the world line of a given dust particle spirals outwards, forms a circular cusp, then spirals inward and reconverges at a subsequent event on the world line of the original dust particle. This means that observers looking orthogonally to the $\vec{e}_2$ direction can see only finitely far out, and also see themselves at an earlier time.

The cusp is a non-geodesic closed null curve. (See the more detailed discussion below using an alternative coordinate chart.)

=== Closed timelike curves ===
In a flat spacetime, a circle drawn (orthogonally) around a timelike axis, would itself be a spacelike loop. That is also true in Gödel spacetime for small enough circles, but if we increase their size, they will shift to further frames, that are twisted relative to the close ones. This twisting eventually turns the (originally spacelike) loop's direction into the time cone, so the larger loops become closed timelike curves (CTCs). Since Gödel spacetime is homogeneous, that means there are CTCs through every event in it. This causal anomaly seems to have been regarded as the whole point of the model by Gödel himself, who was apparently striving to prove that Einstein's equations of spacetime are not consistent with what we intuitively understand time to be (i. e. that it passes and the past no longer exists, the position philosophers call presentism, whereas Gödel seems to have been arguing for something more like the philosophy of eternalism).

Einstein was aware of Gödel's solution (the two of them being close friends) and commented in Albert Einstein: Philosopher-Scientist that if there are a series of causally-connected events in which "the series is closed in itself" (in other words, a closed timelike curve), then this suggests that there is no good physical way to define whether a given event in the series happened "earlier" or "later" than another event in the series:

In that case the distinction "earlier-later" is abandoned for world-points which lie far apart in a cosmological sense, and those paradoxes, regarding the direction of the causal connection, arise, of which Mr. Gödel has spoken.

Such cosmological solutions of the gravitation-equations (with not vanishing A-constant) have been found by Mr. Gödel. It will be interesting to weigh whether these are not to be excluded on physical grounds.

=== Globally nonhyperbolic ===
If the Gödel spacetime admitted any boundaryless temporal hyperslices (e.g. a Cauchy surface), any such CTC would have to intersect it an odd number of times, contradicting the fact that the spacetime is simply connected. Therefore, this spacetime is not globally hyperbolic.

== A cylindrical chart ==
In this section, we introduce another coordinate chart for the Gödel solution, in which some of the features mentioned above are easier to see.

=== Derivation ===
Gödel did not explain how he found his solution, but there are many possible derivations. We will sketch one here, and at the same time verify some of the claims made above.

Start with a simple frame in a cylindrical type chart, featuring two undetermined functions of the radial coordinate:

$$\vec{e}_0=\partial_t, \; \vec{e}_1=\partial_z, \; \vec{e}_2=\partial_r, \, \vec{e}_3=\frac{1}{b(r)} \, \left( -a(r) \, \partial_t + \partial_\varphi \right)$$

Here, we think of the timelike unit vector field $\vec{e}_0$ as tangent to the world lines of the dust particles, and their world lines will in general exhibit nonzero vorticity but vanishing expansion and shear. Let us demand that the Einstein tensor match a dust term plus a vacuum energy term. This is equivalent to requiring that it match a perfect fluid; i.e., we require that the components of the Einstein tensor, computed with respect to our frame, take the form

$$G^{\hat{i}\hat{j}} = \mu \operatorname{diag}(1,0,0,0) + p \operatorname{diag}(0,1,1,1)$$

This gives the conditions

$$b^{\prime\prime\prime} = \frac{b^{\prime\prime} \, b^{\prime}}{b}, \; \left( a^\prime \right)^2 = 2 \, b^{\prime\prime} \, b$$

Plugging these into the Einstein tensor, we see that in fact we now have $\mu = p$. The simplest nontrivial spacetime we can construct in this way evidently would have this coefficient be some nonzero but constant function of the radial coordinate. Specifically, with a bit of foresight, let us choose $\mu = \omega^2$. This gives

$$b(r) = \frac{\sinh(\sqrt{2} \omega \,r)}{\sqrt{2} \omega}, \; a(r) = \frac{\cosh(\sqrt{2} \omega r)}{\omega} + c$$

Finally, let us demand that this frame satisfy

$$\vec{e}_3 = \frac{1}{r} \, \partial_\varphi + O \left( \frac{1}{r^2} \right)$$

This gives $c=-1/\omega$, and our frame becomes

$$\vec{e}_0=\partial_t, \; \vec{e}_1=\partial_z, \; \vec{e}_2=\partial_r, \; \vec{e}_3 = \frac{ \sqrt{2} \omega }{ \sinh( \sqrt{2} \omega r ) } \, \partial_\varphi - \frac{\sqrt{2}\sinh(\sqrt{2} \omega r)}{1+\cosh(\sqrt{2} \omega r)} \, \partial_t$$

=== Appearance of the light cones ===
From the metric tensor we find that the vector field $\partial_\varphi$, which is spacelike for small radii, becomes null at $r = r_c$ where

$$r_c = \frac{\operatorname{arccosh}(3)}{\sqrt{2} \omega}$$

This is because at that radius we find that $\vec{e}_3 = \tfrac{ \omega }2 \, \partial_\varphi - \partial_t$, so $\tfrac{ \omega }2 \, \partial_\varphi = \vec{e}_3+\vec{e}_0$ and is therefore null. The circle $r = r_c$ at a given t is a closed null curve, but not a null geodesic.

Examining the frame above, we can see that the coordinate $z$ is inessential; our spacetime is the direct product of a factor R with a signature −++ three-manifold. Suppressing $z$ in order to focus our attention on this three-manifold, let us examine how the appearance of the light cones changes as we travel out from the axis of symmetry $r = 0$:

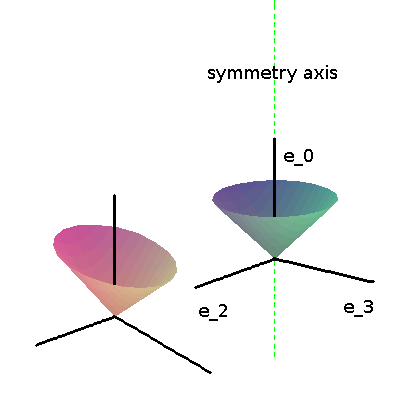
Two light cones (with their accompanying frame vectors) in the cylindrical chart for the Gödel lambda dust solution. As we move outwards from the nominal symmetry axis, the cones tip forward and widen. Vertical coordinate lines (representing the world lines of the dust particles) are timelike.

When we get to the critical radius, the cones become tangent to the closed null curve.

=== A congruence of closed timelike curves ===
At the critical radius $r = r_c$, the vector field $\partial_\varphi$ becomes null. For larger radii, it is timelike. Thus, corresponding to our symmetry axis we have a timelike congruence made up of circles and corresponding to certain observers. This congruence is however only defined outside the cylinder $r=r_c$.

This is not a geodesic congruence; rather, each observer in this family must maintain a constant acceleration in order to hold his course. Observers with smaller radii must accelerate harder; as $r \rightarrow r_c$ the magnitude of acceleration diverges, which is just what is expected, given that $r=r_c$ is a null curve.

=== Null geodesics ===
If we examine the past light cone of an event on the axis of symmetry, we find the following picture:

The null geodesics spiral counterclockwise toward an observer on the axis of symmetry. This shows them from "above".

Recall that vertical coordinate lines in our chart represent the world lines of the dust particles, but despite their straight appearance in our chart, the congruence formed by these curves has nonzero vorticity, so the world lines are actually twisting about each other. The fact that the null geodesics spiral inwards in the manner shown above means that when our observer, when looking radially outwards, sees nearby dust particles not at their current locations, but at their earlier locations. This is what we would expect if the dust particles are in fact rotating about one another.

The null geodesics are geometrically straight; in the figure, they appear to be spirals only because the coordinates are "rotating" in order to permit the dust particles to appear stationary.

=== The absolute future ===
According to Hawking and Ellis (see monograph cited below), all light rays emitted from an event on the symmetry axis reconverge at a later event on the axis, with the null geodesics forming a circular cusp (which is a null curve, but not a null geodesic):

Hawking and Ellis picture of expansion and reconvergence of light emitted by an observer on the axis of symmetry.

This implies that in the Gödel lambda dust solution, the absolute future of each event has a character very different from what we might naively expect.

== Cosmological interpretation ==
Following Gödel, we can interpret the dust particles as galaxies, so that the Gödel solution becomes a cosmological model of a rotating universe. Besides rotating, this model exhibits no Hubble expansion, so it is not a realistic model of the universe in which we live, but can be taken as illustrating an alternative universe, which would in principle be allowed by general relativity (if one admits the legitimacy of a negative cosmological constant). Less well-known solutions of Gödel's exhibit both rotation and Hubble expansion and have other qualities of his first model, but traveling into the past is not possible. According to Stephen Hawking, these models could well be a reasonable description of the universe that we observe; however, observational data are compatible only with a very low rate of rotation. The quality of these observations improved continually up until Gödel's death, and he would always ask "Is the universe rotating yet?" and be told "No, it isn't".

We have seen that observers lying on the y axis (in the original chart) see the rest of the universe rotating clockwise about that axis. However, the homogeneity of the spacetime shows that the direction but not the position of this "axis" is distinguished.

Some have interpreted the Gödel universe as a counterexample to Einstein's hopes that general relativity should exhibit some kind of Mach's principle, citing the fact that the matter is rotating (world lines twisting about each other) in a manner sufficient to pick out a preferred direction, although with no distinguished axis of rotation.

Others take Mach principle to mean some physical law tying the definition of non-spinning inertial frames at each event to the global distribution and motion of matter everywhere in the universe, and say that because the non-spinning inertial frames are precisely tied to the rotation of the dust in just the way such a Mach principle would suggest, this model does accord with Mach's ideas.

Many other exact solutions that can be interpreted as cosmological models of rotating universes are known.

== See also ==
- van Stockum dust, for another rotating dust solution with (true) cylindrical symmetry,
- Dust solution, an article about dust solutions in general relativity.

== Notes ==
- G. Dautcourt and M. Abdel-Megied (2006). "Revisiting the Light Cone of the Goedel Universe". Classical and Quantum Gravity. 23 (4): 1269–1288. arXiv:gr-qc/0511015. Bibcode:2006CQGra..23.1269D. doi:10.1088/0264-9381/23/4/013. S2CID 14666907.
- Stephani, Hans; Kramer, Dietrich; MacCallum, Malcolm; Hoenselaers, Cornelius; Herlt, Eduard (2003). Exact Solutions to Einstein's Field Equations (2nd ed.). Cambridge: Cambridge University Press. ISBN 0-521-46136-7. See section 12.4 for the uniqueness theorem.
- Hawking, Stephen; Ellis, G. F. R. (1973). The Large Scale Structure of Space-Time. Cambridge: Cambridge University Press. ISBN 0-521-09906-4. See section 5.7 for a classic discussion of CTCs in the Gödel spacetime. Warning: in Fig. 31, the light cones do indeed tip over, but they also widen, so that vertical coordinate lines are always timelike; indeed, these represent the world lines of the dust particles, so they are timelike geodesics.
- Gödel, Kurt (1949-07-01). "An Example of a New Type of Cosmological Solutions of Einstein's Field Equations of Gravitation" (PDF). Reviews of Modern Physics. 21 (3): 447–450. Bibcode:1949RvMP...21..447G. doi:10.1103/RevModPhys.21.447. ISSN 0034-6861.
- Vukovic R. (2014): Tensor Model of the Rotating Universe, Exercise in Special Relativity.
