= Felix Pirani =

British theoretical physicist (1928-2015)

- Born: 2 February 1928; England
- Died: 31 December 2015 (aged 87); London, England
- Citizenship: British
- Education: University of Toronto; Carnegie Institute of Technology; University of Cambridge
- Known for: Gravitational wave solution
- Scientific career
- Fields: Theoretical physics General relativity
- Workplaces: King's College London
- Doctoral advisors: Alfred Schild; Hermann Bondi
- Doctoral students: Valentine Joseph; Peter Szekeres

Felix Arnold Edward Pirani (2 February 1928 – 31 December 2015) was a British theoretical physicist, and professor at King's College London, specialising in gravitational physics and general relativity. Pirani and Hermann Bondi wrote a series of articles, from 1959 to 1989, that established the existence of plane wave solutions for gravitational waves based on general relativity.

During the last half of the 20th century Pirani was politically active, studied disarmament and advocated the responsible use of science.

His most famous scientific results include works on the physical meaning of the curvature tensor, gravitational waves, and the algebraic classification of the Weyl tensor, which he discovered in 1957 independently of A.Z. Petrov and is sometimes called the Petrov–Pirani classification.

== Early life and education ==
Pirani was born in London, England to Leila (née Doubleday), a violinist, and Max Pirani, a pianist. Pirani's family, who were Jewish, moved to Canada at the start of World War II. He studied at the University of Western Ontario, graduating with a Bachelor degreee in 1948 and at the University of Toronto where he received his Master's degree in 1949. He obtained his DSc at the Carnegie Institute of Technology, now Carnegie Mellon University, in 1951 under Alfred Schild. His DSc dissertation was an early contribution to the quantum theory of general relativity. In 1956, he obtained a PhD in physics at the University of University of Cambridge under Hermann Bondi.

== Scientific work ==
Pirani performed post-doctoral research at the Institute for Advanced Studies in Dublin, Ireland. In 1958, he started teaching at King's College London, where Bondi was also teaching, and in 1968 became professor of rational mechanics there.

In 1957, Pirani independently discovered what was later called the Petrov classification (also Petrov–Pirani–Penrose classification) and separately discovered by Petrov in 1954.

In 1959, Bondi, Pirani and Ivor Robinson published a fundamental paper on gravitational wave solutions in general relativity and showed the existence of plane gravitational wave solutions. Pirani's work with Bondi and Robinson resulted in correspondence between Pirani and Albert Einstein, some of whose partially expressed views on the subject had been challenged by the paper.

In 1972, Pirani, Jürgen Ehlers and Alfred Schild showed that the space-time geometry of general relativity can be constructed from simple measuring processes with light beams and free-falling particles.

== Popular books ==
In 1960, Pirani revised the general audience book "The ABC of Relativity", originally written by Bertrand Russell in 1925. He continued revisions up to 2002. In the 1990s he began writing books aimed at the general audience, e.g. Introducing the Universe, translated into French as L'Astronomie sans aspirine (Astronomy without aspirin).

== Political views ==
Pirani was politically active in the 1970s and 1980s, had a left leaning stance, and opposed the unchecked use of science for military purposes. Along with DNA pioneer Maurice Wilkins, who was also at King's, Pirani was involved in the British Society for Social Responsibility in Science.

In 197, Pirani told the New Scientist that during an academic visit to the University of North Carolina issues about slavery and the American Civil War "hit him in the face" and upon his return to England he joined the Scientists of the Left and the Campaign for Nuclear Disarmament and became a political activist. Pirani studied disarmament and founded the Science Forum as a group of scientists that met monthly in London to discuss the social problems of science. Pirani's efforts were based on his view that the public belief that "science will solve the world's problems" is a delusion because funding for research comes from the top levels of the social hierarchy, which controls the direction of scientific progress for its own purposes.
