= Jürgen Ehlers =

German physicist

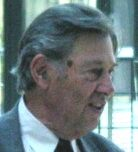
- At the award ceremony for the Charles University Medal in Potsdam, September 2007
- Born: 29 December 1929; Hamburg, Weimar Republic
- Died: 20 May 2008 (aged 78); Potsdam, Brandenburg, Germany
- Education: University of Hamburg
- Known for: General relativity Mathematical physics
- Awards: Max Planck Medal (2002)
- Scientific career
- Fields: Physics
- Workplaces: University of Hamburg; Max Planck Institute for Astrophysics; Max Planck Institute for Gravitational Physics
- Doctoral advisor: Pascual Jordan

Jürgen Ehlers (German: [ˈjʏʁɡn̩ ˈʔeːlɐs]; 29 December 1929 – 20 May 2008) was a German physicist who contributed to the understanding of Albert Einstein's theory of general relativity. From graduate and postgraduate work in Pascual Jordan's relativity research group at Hamburg University, he held various posts as a lecturer and, later, as a professor before joining the Max Planck Institute for Astrophysics in Munich as a director. In 1995, he became the founding director of the newly created Max Planck Institute for Gravitational Physics in Potsdam, Germany.

Ehlers' research focused on the foundations of general relativity as well as on the theory's applications to astrophysics. He formulated a suitable classification of exact solutions to Einstein's field equations and proved the Ehlers–Geren–Sachs theorem that justifies the application of simple, general-relativistic model universes to modern cosmology. He created a spacetime-oriented description of gravitational lensing and clarified the relationship between models formulated within the framework of general relativity and those of Newtonian gravity. In addition, Ehlers had a keen interest in both the history and philosophy of physics and was an ardent populariser of science.

== Biography ==
=== Early life ===
Jürgen Ehlers was born in Hamburg on 29 December 1929. He attended public schools from 1936 to 1949, and then went on to study physics, mathematics and philosophy at Hamburg University from 1949 to 1955. In the winter term of 1955–56, he passed the high school teacher's examination (Staatsexamen), but instead of becoming a teacher undertook graduate research with Pascual Jordan, who acted as his thesis advisor. Ehlers' doctoral work was on the construction and characterization of solutions of the Einstein field equations. He earned his doctorate in physics from Hamburg University in 1958.

Prior to Ehlers' arrival, the main research of Jordan's group had been dedicated to a scalar-tensor modification of general relativity that later became known as Jordan–Brans–Dicke theory. This theory differs from general relativity in that the gravitational constant is replaced by a variable field. Ehlers was instrumental in changing the group's focus to the structure and interpretation of Einstein's original theory. Other members of the group included Wolfgang Kundt, Rainer K. Sachs and Manfred Trümper. The group had a close working relationship with Otto Heckmann and his student Engelbert Schücking at Hamburger Sternwarte, the city's observatory. Guests at the group's colloquium included Wolfgang Pauli, Joshua Goldberg and Peter Bergmann.

In 1961, as Jordan's assistant, Ehlers earned his habilitation, qualifying him for a German professorship. He then held teaching and research positions in Germany and in the US, namely at the University of Kiel, Syracuse University and Hamburg University. From 1964 to 1965, he was at the Graduate Research Center of the Southwest in Dallas. From 1965 to 1971, he held various positions in Alfred Schild's group at the University of Texas at Austin, starting as an associate professor and, in 1967, obtaining a position as full professor. During that time, he held visiting professorships at the universities of Würzburg and Bonn.

=== Munich ===
In 1970, Ehlers received an offer to join the Max Planck Institute for Physics and Astrophysics in Munich as the director of its gravitational theory department. Ehlers had been suggested by Ludwig Biermann, the institute's director at the time. When Ehlers joined the institute in 1971, he also became an adjunct professor at LMU Munich. In March 1991, the institute split into the Max Planck Institute for Physics and the Max Planck Institute for Astrophysics, where Ehlers' department found a home. Over the 24 years of his tenure, his research group was home to, among others, Gary Gibbons, John Stewart and Bernd Schmidt, as well as visiting scientists including Abhay Ashtekar, Demetrios Christodoulou and Brandon Carter.

One of Ehlers' postdoctoral students in Munich was Reinhard Breuer, who later became editor-in-chief of Spektrum der Wissenschaft, the German edition of the popular-science journal Scientific American.

=== Potsdam ===
When German science institutions reorganized after German reunification in 1990, Ehlers lobbied for the establishment of an institute of the Max Planck Society dedicated to research on gravitational theory. On 9 June 1994, the Society decided to open the Max Planck Institute for Gravitational Physics in Potsdam. The institute started operations on 1 April 1995, with Ehlers as its founding director and as the leader of its department for the foundations and mathematics of general relativity. Ehlers then oversaw the founding of a second institute department devoted to gravitational wave research and headed by Bernard F. Schutz. On 31 December 1998, Ehlers retired to become founding director emeritus.

Ehlers continued to work at the institute until his death on 20 May 2008. He left behind his wife Anita Ehlers, his four children, Martin, Kathrin, David, and Max, as well as five grandchildren.

== Research ==
Ehlers' research was in the field of general relativity. In particular, he made contributions to cosmology, the theory of gravitational lenses and gravitational waves. His principal concern was to clarify general relativity's mathematical structure and its consequences, separating rigorous proofs from heuristic conjectures.

=== Exact solutions ===
For his doctoral thesis, Ehlers turned to a question that was to shape his lifetime research. He sought exact solutions of Einstein's equations: model universes consistent with the laws of general relativity that are simple enough to allow for an explicit description in terms of basic mathematical expressions. These exact solutions play a key role when it comes to building general-relativistic models of physical situations. However, general relativity is a fully covariant theory – its laws are the same, independent of which coordinates are chosen to describe a given situation. One direct consequence is that two apparently different exact solutions could correspond to the same model universe, and differ only in their coordinates. Ehlers began to look for serviceable ways of characterizing exact solutions invariantly, that is, in ways that do not depend on coordinate choice. In order to do so, he examined ways of describing the intrinsic geometric properties of the known exact solutions.

During the 1960s, following up on his doctoral thesis, Ehlers published a series of papers, all but one in collaboration with colleagues from the Hamburg group, which later became known as the "Hamburg Bible". The first paper, written with Jordan and Kundt, is a treatise on how to characterize exact solutions to Einstein's field equations in a systematic way. The analysis presented there uses tools from differential geometry such as the Petrov classification of Weyl tensors (that is, those parts of the Riemann tensor describing the curvature of space-time that are not constrained by Einstein's equations), isometry groups and conformal transformations. This work also includes the first definition and classification of pp-waves, a class of simple gravitational waves.

The following papers in the series were treatises on gravitational radiation (one with Sachs, one with Trümper). The work with Sachs studies, among other things, vacuum solutions with special algebraic properties, using the 2-component spinor formalism. It also gives a systematic exposition of the geometric properties of bundles (in mathematical terms: congruences) of light beams. Spacetime geometry can influence the propagation of light, making them converge on or diverge from each other, or deforming the bundle's cross section without changing its area. The paper formalizes these possible changes in the bundle in terms of the bundle's expansion (convergence/divergence), and twist and shear (cross-section area-conserving deformation), linking those properties to spacetime geometry. One result is the Ehlers-Sachs theorem describing the properties of the shadow produced by a narrow beam of light encountering an opaque object. The tools developed in that work would prove essential for the discovery by Roy Kerr of his Kerr solution, describing a rotating black hole – one of the most important exact solutions.

The last of these seminal papers addressed the general-relativistic treatment of the mechanics of continuous media. However useful the notion of a point mass may be in classical physics; in general relativity, such an idealized mass concentration into a single point of space is not even well-defined. That is why relativistic hydrodynamics, that is, the study of continuous media, is an essential part of model-building in general relativity. The paper systematically describes the basic concepts and models in what the editor of the journal General Relativity and Gravitation, on the occasion of publishing an English translation 32 years after the original publication date, called "one of the best reviews in this area".

Another part of Ehlers' exploration of exact solutions in his thesis led to a result that proved important later. At the time he started his research on his doctoral thesis, the Golden age of general relativity had not yet begun and the basic properties and concepts of black holes were not yet understood. In the work that led to his doctoral thesis, Ehlers proved important properties of the surface around a black hole that would later be identified as its horizon, in particular that the gravitational field inside cannot be static, but must change over time. The simplest example of this is the "Einstein-Rosen bridge", or Schwarzschild wormhole that is part of the Schwarzschild solution describing an idealized, spherically symmetric black hole: the interior of the horizon houses a bridge-like connection that changes over time, collapsing sufficiently quickly to keep any space-traveler from traveling through the wormhole.

=== Ehlers group ===
In physics, duality means that two equivalent descriptions of a particular physical situation exist, using different physical concepts. This is a special case of a physical symmetry, that is, a change that preserves key features of a physical system. A simple example for a duality is that between the electric field E and the magnetic field B electrodynamics: In the complete absence of electrical charges, the replacement E $\to$ –B, B $\to$ E leaves Maxwell's equations invariant. Whenever a particular pair of expressions for B and E conform to the laws of electrodynamics, switching the two expressions around and adding a minus sign to the new B is also valid.

In his doctoral thesis, Ehlers pointed out a duality symmetry between different components of the metric of a stationary vacuum spacetime, which maps solutions of Einstein's field equations to other solutions. This symmetry between the tt-component of the metric, which describes time as measured by clocks whose spatial coordinates do not change, and a term known as the twist potential is analogous to the aforementioned duality between E and B.

The duality discovered by Ehlers was later expanded to a larger symmetry corresponding to the special linear group $SL(2)$. This larger symmetry group has since become known as the Ehlers group. Its discovery led to further generalizations, notably the infinite-dimensional Geroch group (the Geroch group is generated by two non-commuting subgroups, one of which is the Ehlers group). These so-called hidden symmetries play an important role in the Kaluza–Klein reduction of both general relativity and its generalizations, such as eleven-dimensional supergravity. Other applications include their use as a tool in the discovery of previously unknown solutions and their role in a proof that solutions in the stationary axi-symmetric case form an integrable system.

=== Cosmology: Ehlers–Geren–Sachs theorem ===
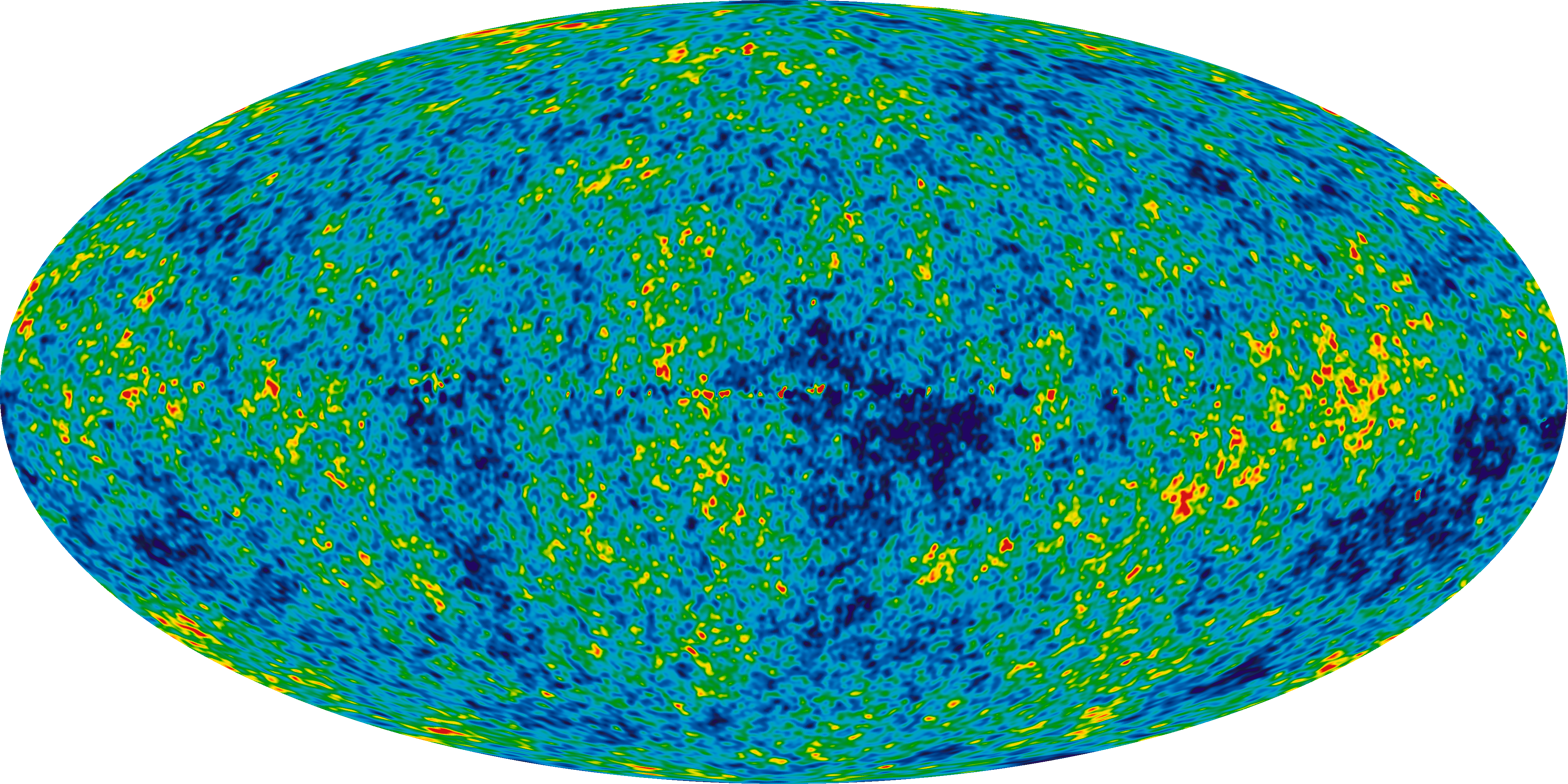
The inhomogeneities in the temperature of the cosmic background radiation recorded in this image from the satellite probe WMAP amount to no more than 10^{−4} kelvins.

The Ehlers–Geren–Sachs theorem, published in 1968, shows that in a given universe, if all freely falling observers measure the cosmic background radiation to have exactly the same properties in all directions (that is, they measure the background radiation to be isotropic), then that universe is an isotropic and homogeneous Friedmann–Lemaître spacetime. Cosmic isotropy and homogeneity are important as they are the basis of the modern standard model of cosmology.

=== Fundamental concepts in general relativity ===
In the 1960s, Ehlers collaborated with Felix Pirani and Alfred Schild on a constructive-axiomatic approach to general relativity: a way of deriving the theory from a minimal set of elementary objects and a set of axioms specifying these objects' properties. The basic ingredients of their approach are primitive concepts such as event, light ray, particle and freely falling particle. At the outset, spacetime is a mere set of events, without any further structure. They postulated the basic properties of light and freely falling particles as axioms, and with their help constructed the differential topology, conformal structure and, finally, the metric structure of spacetime, that is: the notion of when two events are close to each other, the role of light rays in linking up events, and a notion of distance between events. Key steps of the construction correspond to idealized measurements, such the standard range finding used in radar. The final step derived Einstein's equations from the weakest possible set of additional axioms. The result is a formulation that clearly identifies the assumptions underlying general relativity.

In the 1970s, in collaboration with Ekkart Rudolph, Ehlers addressed the problem of rigid bodies in general relativity. Rigid bodies are a fundamental concept in classical physics. However, the fact that by definition their different parts move simultaneously is incompatible with the relativistic concept of the speed of light as a limiting speed for the propagation of signals and other influences. While, as early as 1909, Max Born had given a definition of rigidity that was compatible with relativistic physics, his definition depends on assumptions that are not satisfied in a general space-time, and are thus overly restrictive. Ehlers and Rudolph generalized Born's definition to a more readily applicable definition they called "pseudo-rigidity", which represents a more satisfactory approximation to the rigidity of classical physics.

=== Gravitational lensing ===
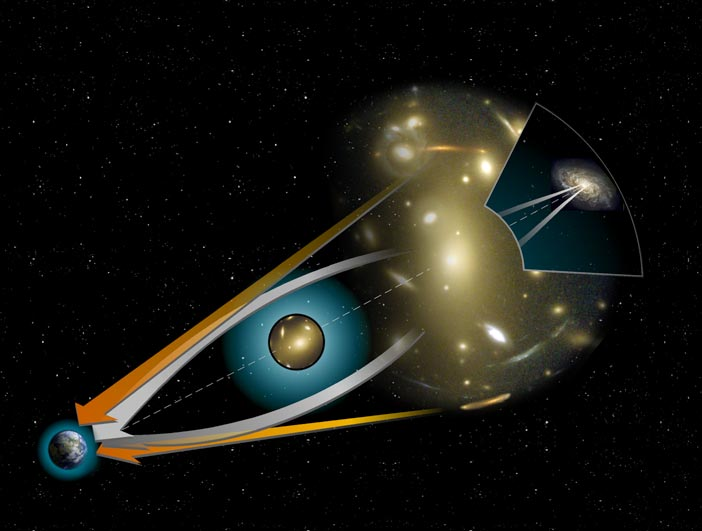
Most astrophysical modeling of gravitational lens systems makes use of the quasi-Newtonian approximation

With Peter Schneider, Ehlers embarked on an in-depth study of the foundations of gravitational lensing. One result of this work was a 1992 monograph co-authored with Schneider and Emilio Falco. It was the first systematic exposition of the topic that included both the theoretical foundations and the observational results. From the viewpoint of astronomy, gravitational lensing is often described using a quasi-Newtonian approximation—assuming the gravitational field to be small and the deflection angles to be minute—which is perfectly sufficient for most situations of astrophysical relevance. In contrast, the monograph developed a thorough and complete description of gravitational lensing from a fully relativistic space-time perspective. This feature of the book played a major part in its long-term positive reception. In the following years, Ehlers continued his research on the propagation of bundles of light in arbitrary spacetimes.

=== Frame theory and Newtonian gravity ===
A basic derivation of the Newtonian limit of general relativity is as old as the theory itself. Einstein used it to derive predictions such as the anomalous perihelion precession of the planet Mercury. Later work by Élie Cartan, Kurt Friedrichs and others showed more concretely how a geometrical generalization of Newton's theory of gravity known as Newton–Cartan theory could be understood as a (degenerate) limit of general relativity. This required letting a specific parameter $\lambda$ go to zero. Ehlers extended this work by developing a frame theory that allowed for constructing the Newton–Cartan limit, and in a mathematically precise way, not only for the physical laws, but for any spacetime obeying those laws (that is, solutions of Einstein's equations). This allowed physicists to explore what the Newtonian limit meant in specific physical situations. For example, the frame theory can be used to show that the Newtonian limit of a Schwarzschild black hole is a simple point particle. Also, it allows Newtonian versions of exact solutions such as the Friedmann–Lemaître models or the Gödel universe to be constructed. Since its inception, ideas Ehlers introduced in the context of his frame theory have found important applications in the study of both the Newtonian limit of general relativity and of the Post-Newtonian expansion, where Newtonian gravity is complemented by terms of ever higher order in $1/c^2$ in order to accommodate relativistic effects.

General relativity is non-linear: the gravitational influence of two masses is not simply the sum of those masses' individual gravitational influences, as had been the case in Newtonian gravity. Ehlers participated in the discussion of how the back-reaction from gravitational radiation onto a radiating system could be systematically described in a non-linear theory such as general relativity, pointing out that the standard quadrupole formula for the energy flux for systems like the binary pulsar had not (yet) been rigorously derived: a priori, a derivation demanded the inclusion of higher-order terms than was commonly assumed, higher than were computed until then.

His work on the Newtonian limit, particularly in relation to cosmological solutions, led Ehlers, together with his former doctoral student Thomas Buchert, to a systematic study of perturbations and inhomogeneities in a Newtonian cosmos. This laid the groundwork for Buchert's later generalization of this treatment of inhomogeneities. This generalization was the basis of his attempt to explain what is currently seen as the cosmic effects of a cosmological constant or, in modern parlance, dark energy, as a non-linear consequence of inhomogeneities in general-relativistic cosmology.

=== History and philosophy of physics ===
Complementing his interest in the foundations of general relativity and, more generally, of physics, Ehlers researched the history of physics. Up until his death, he collaborated in a project on the history of quantum theory at the Max Planck Institute for the History of Science in Berlin. In particular, he explored Pascual Jordan's seminal contributions to the development of quantum field theory between 1925 and 1928. Throughout his career, Ehlers had an interest in the philosophical foundations and implications of physics and contributed to research on this topic by addressing questions such as the basic status of scientific knowledge in physics.

=== Science popularization ===
Ehlers showed a keen interest in reaching a general audience. He was a frequent public lecturer, at universities as well as at venues such as the Urania in Berlin. He authored popular-science articles, including contributions to general-audience journals such as Bild der Wissenschaft. He edited a compilation of articles on gravity for the German edition of Scientific American. Ehlers directly addressed physics teachers, in talks and journal articles on the teaching of relativity and related basic ideas, such as mathematics as the language of physics.

== Honours and awards ==
Ehlers became a member of the Berlin-Brandenburg Academy of Sciences and Humanities (1993), the Akademie der Wissenschaften und der Literatur, Mainz (1972), the Leopoldina in Halle (1975) and the Bavarian Academy of Sciences and Humanities in Munich (1979). From 1995 to 1998, he served as president of the International Society on General Relativity and Gravitation. He also received the 2002 Max Planck Medal of the German Physical Society, the Volta Gold Medal of Pavia University (2005) and the medal of the Faculty of Natural Sciences of Charles University, Prague (2007).

In 2008, the International Society on General Relativity and Gravitation instituted the "Jürgen Ehlers Thesis Prize" in commemoration of Ehlers. It is sponsored by the scientific publishing house Springer and is awarded triennially, at the society's international conference, to the best doctoral thesis in the areas of mathematical and numerical general relativity. Issue 9 of volume 41 of the journal General Relativity and Gravitation was dedicated to Ehlers, in memoriam.

== Selected publications ==
- Börner, G.; Ehlers, J., eds. (1996), Gravitation, Spektrum Akademischer Verlag, ISBN 3-86025-362-X
- Ehlers, Jürgen (1973), "Survey of general relativity theory", in Israel, Werner (ed.), Relativity, Astrophysics and Cosmology, D. Reidel, pp. 1–125, ISBN 90-277-0369-8
- Schneider, P.; Ehlers, J.; Falco, E. E. (1992), Gravitational lenses, Springer, ISBN 3-540-66506-4
