= Van Stockum dust =

Exact solution of the Einstein field equations

In general relativity, the van Stockum dust or the Lanczos–van Stockum dust is an exact solution of the Einstein field equations where the gravitational field is generated by dust rotating about an axis of cylindrical symmetry. Since the density of the dust is increasing with distance from this axis, the solution is rather artificial, but as one of the simplest known solutions in general relativity, it stands as a pedagogically important example.

This solution is named after Willem Jacob van Stockum, who rediscovered it in 1938 independently of a much earlier discovery by Cornelius Lanczos in 1924.

== Derivation ==
One way of obtaining this solution is to look for a cylindrically symmetric perfect fluid solution in which the fluid exhibits rigid rotation. That is, we demand that the world lines of the fluid particles form a timelike congruence having nonzero vorticity but vanishing expansion and shear. (In fact, since dust particles feel no forces, this will turn out to be a timelike geodesic congruence, but this needs not be assumed in advance.)

A simple ansatz corresponding to this demand is expressed by the following frame field, which contains two undetermined functions of $r$:

$$\vec{e}_0 = \partial_t, \; \vec{e}_1 = f(r) \, \partial_z, \; \vec{e}_2 = f(r) \, \partial_r, \; \vec{e}_3 = \frac{1}{r} \, \partial_\varphi - h(r) \, \partial_t$$

To prevent misunderstanding, we should emphasize that taking the dual coframe

$$\sigma^0 = dt + h(r) r \, d\varphi, \; \sigma^1 = \frac{1}{f(r)} \, dz, \; \sigma^2 = \frac{1}{f(r)} \, dr, \; \sigma^3 = r d\varphi$$

gives the metric tensor in terms of the same two undetermined functions:

$$g = -\sigma^0 \otimes \sigma^0 + \sigma^1 \otimes \sigma^1 + \sigma^2 \otimes \sigma^2 + \sigma^3 \otimes \sigma^3$$

Multiplying out gives

$$ds^2 = -dt^2 - 2 h(r) r \, dt \, d\varphi + (1-h(r)^2) r^2 \, d\varphi^2 + \frac{dz^2 + dr^2}{f(r)^2}$$
$$-\infty < t,z < \infty, \; 0 < r < \infty, \; -\pi < \varphi < \pi$$

We compute the Einstein tensor with respect to this frame, in terms of the two undetermined functions, and demand that the result have the form appropriate for a perfect fluid solution with the timelike unit vector $\vec{e}_0$ everywhere tangent to the world line of a fluid particle. That is, we demand that

$$G^{\hat{m}\hat{n}} = 8 \pi \mu \operatorname{diag}(1,0,0,0) + 8 \pi p \operatorname{diag}(0,1,1,1)$$

This gives the conditions

$$f^{\prime\prime} = \frac{(f^\prime)^2}{f} + \frac{f^\prime}{r}, \; (h^\prime)^2 + \frac{2 h^\prime h}{r} + \frac{h^2}{r^2} = \frac{4 f^\prime}{rf}$$

Solving for $f(r)=\exp(a^2r^2/2)$ and $h(r)=ar$ gives the desired frame defining the van Stockum solution:

$$\vec{e}_0 = \partial_t, \; \vec{e}_1 = \exp(a^2 r^2/2) \, \partial_z, \; \vec{e}_2 = \exp(a^2 r^2/2) \, \partial_r, \; \vec{e}_3 = \frac{1}{r} \, \partial_\phi - a r \, \partial_t$$

Note that this frame is only defined on $r>0$.

== Properties ==
Computing the Einstein tensor with respect to our frame shows that in fact the pressure vanishes, so we have a dust solution. The mass density of the dust turns out to be

$$\mu = \frac{a^2}{2 \pi} \exp(a^2 r^2)$$

Happily, this is finite on the axis of symmetry $r=0$, but the density increases with radius, a feature which unfortunately severely limits possible astrophysical applications.

Solving the Killing equations shows that this spacetime admits a three-dimensional abelian Lie algebra of Killing vector fields, generated by

$$\vec{\xi}_1 = \partial_t, \; \vec{\xi}_2 = \partial_z, \; \vec{\xi}_3 = \partial_\phi$$

Here, $\vec{\xi}_1$ has nonzero vorticity, so we have a stationary spacetime invariant under translation along the world lines of the dust particles, and also under translation along the axis of cylindrical symmetry and rotation about that axis.

Note that unlike the Gödel dust solution, in the van Stockum dust the dust particles are rotating about a geometrically distinguished axis.

As promised, the expansion and shear of the timelike geodesic congruence $\vec{e}_0$ vanishes, but the vorticity vector is

$$\vec{\Omega} = -a \exp(a^2 r^2/2) \vec{e}_1$$

This means that even though in our comoving chart the world lines of the dust particles appear as vertical lines, in fact they are twisting about one another as the dust particles swirl about the axis of symmetry. In other words, if we follow the evolution of a small ball of dust, we find that it rotates about its own axis (parallel to $r=0$), but does not shear or expand; the latter properties define what we mean by rigid rotation. Notice that on the axis itself, the magnitude of the vorticity vector becomes simply $a$.

The tidal tensor is

$$E_{\hat{m}\hat{n}} = a^2 \exp(a^2 r^2) \operatorname{diag}(0,1,1)$$

which shows that observers riding on the dust particles experience isotropic tidal tension in the plane of rotation. The magnetogravitic tensor is

$$B_{\hat{m}\hat{n}} = -a^3 \exp(a^2 r^2) \left[\begin{matrix} 0 & 1 & 0 \\ 1 & 0 & 0 \\ 0 & 0 & 0 \end{matrix} \right]$$

== An apparent paradox ==
Consider a thought experiment in which an observer riding on a dust particle sitting on the axis of symmetry looks out at dust particles with positive radial coordinate. Does he see them to be rotating, or not?

Since the top array of null geodesics is obtained simply by translating upwards the lower array, and since the three world lines are all vertical (invariant under time translation), it might seem that the answer is "no". However, while the frame given above is an inertial frame, computing the covariant derivatives

$$\nabla_{\vec{e}_0} \vec{e}_1, \; \nabla_{\vec{e}_0} \vec{e}_2, \; \nabla_{\vec{e}_0} \vec{e}_3$$

shows that only the first vanishes identically. In other words, the remaining spatial vectors are spinning about $\vec{e}_1$ (i.e. about an axis parallel to the axis of cylindrical symmetry of this spacetime).

Thus, to obtain a nonspinning inertial frame we need to spin up our original frame, like this:

$$\vec{f}_0 = \vec{e}_0, \; \vec{f}_1 = \vec{e}_1, \; \vec{f}_2 = \cos(\theta) \vec{e}_2 + \sin(\theta) \vec{e}_3, \; \vec{f}_3 = -\sin(\theta) \vec{e}_2 + \cos(\theta) \vec{e}_3$$

where $\theta = t q(r)$ where q is a new undetermined function of r. Plugging in the requirement that the covariant derivatives vanish, we obtain

$$\theta = at\exp(a^2 r^2/2)$$

The new frame appears, in our comoving coordinate chart, to be spinning, but in fact it is gyrostabilized. In particular, since our observer with the green world line in the figure is presumably riding a nonspinning dust particle (otherwise spin-spin forces would be apparent in the dynamics of the dust), he in fact observes nearby radially separated dust particles to be rotating clockwise about his location with angular velocity a. This explains the physical meaning of the parameter which we found in our earlier derivation of the first frame.

(Pedantic note: alert readers will have noticed that we ignored the fact that neither of our frame fields is well defined on the axis. However, we can define a frame for an on-axis observer by an appropriate one-sided limit; this gives a discontinuous frame field, but we only need to define a frame along the world line of our on-axis observer in order to pursue the thought experiment considered in this section.)

It is worth remarking that the null geodesics spiral inwards in the above figure. This means that our on-axis observer sees the other dust particles at time-lagged locations, which is of course just what we would expect. The fact that the null geodesics appear "bent" in this chart is of course an artifact of our choice of comoving coordinates in which the world lines of the dust particles appear as vertical coordinate lines.

== A genuine paradox ==
Let us draw the light cones for some typical events in the van Stockum dust, to see how their appearance (in our comoving cylindrical chart) depends on the radial coordinate:

As the figure shows, at $r=a^{-1}$, the cones become tangent to the coordinate plane $t=t_0$, and we obtain a closed null curve (the red circle). Note that this is not a null geodesic.

As we move further outward, we can see that horizontal circles with larger radii are closed timelike curves. The paradoxical nature of these CTCs was apparently first pointed out by van Stockum: observers whose world lines form a closed timelike curve can apparently revisit or affect their own past. Even worse, there is apparently nothing to prevent such an observer from deciding, on his third lifetime, say, to stop accelerating, which would give him multiple biographies.

These closed timelike curves are not timelike geodesics, so these paradoxical observers must accelerate to experience these effects. Indeed, as we would expect, the required acceleration diverges as these timelike circles approach the null circles lying in the critical cylinder $r=a^{-1}$.

Closed timelike curves turn out to exist in many other exact solutions in general relativity, and their common appearance is one of the most troubling theoretical objections to this theory. However, very few physicists refuse to use general relativity at all on the basis of such objections; rather most take the pragmatic attitude that using general relativity makes sense whenever one can get away with it, because of the relative simplicity and well established reliability of this theory in many astrophysical situations. This is not unlike the fact that many physicists use Newtonian mechanics every day, even though they are well aware that Galilean kinematics has been "overthrown" by relativistic kinematics.

== See also ==
- Dust solution
- Gödel dust solution
