= Wolfgang R. Wasow =

American mathematician

- Born: July 25, 1909; Vevey, Switzerland
- Died: September 11, 1993 (aged 83); Madison, Wisconsin
- Education: New York University
- Known for: Singular Perturbation Theory
- Scientific career
- Fields: Applied Mathematics
- Workplaces: University of Wisconsin–Madison
- Doctoral advisor: Kurt Otto Friedrichs

Wolfgang R. Wasow (25 July 1909 – 11 September 1993) was an American mathematician known for his work in asymptotic expansions and their applications in differential equations.

== Early life ==
Wasow was born as Wolfgang Richard Thal in Vevey, Switzerland, to Jewish parents, Alma Thal and Richard Kleineibst, who had met in Paris. Alma Thal was from Jelgava in Latvia, a part of Czarist Russia at the time. Her family had sent her to Switzerland to put an end to her political activities. Richard Kleineibst was also a political activist and later gained prominence as a leftwing social democrat in the Weimar Republic. He became a founding member of Socialist Workers' Party of Germany in 1931 and was the first editor in chief of Sozialistische Arbeiter-Zeitung, its main organ.

Alma Thal moved to Germany in 1910 and then several more times within Germany. And so Wolfgang grew up first in Munich, and then in Freiburg, Heidelberg and Berlin. When Alma Thal married the Munich photographer Eduard Wasow, Wolfgang took his name. In 1921, Wolfgang Wasow was sent to a boarding school, the Freie Schul- und Werkgemeinschaft Letzlingen, founded by Bernhard Uffrecht, located in the Magdeburg district of Prussia. He passed the Abitur exam and graduated from the school in 1928. After studies at Humboldt and Sorbonne, he enrolled at Göttingen and passed the Staatsexamen (a government licensing examination for future teachers) in mathematics, physics and geology in 1933.

== Emigration ==
Wasow left Germany in 1933 and spent time in Paris and Cambridge before taking a job as a teacher at boarding schools for children of (predominantly Jewish) German emigrants in Italy, first in Florence (1935–37) and then in Lana in Alto Adige (1937–38). After the closure of the latter school in 1938 due to the passage of the Italian Racial Laws, Wasow emigrated to England and then to the United States in 1939.

== Academic career ==
Wasow taught at Goddard College (1939–1941) and Connecticut College (1941–42) and was at the same time a PhD student in mathematics under the supervision of Kurt Otto Friedrichs at New York University. He received his PhD in 1942 and stayed to work as an instructor for mathematics until 1946.

He then held academic and research positions at Swarthmore, UCLA and University of Wisconsin–Madison 1946–1957, interrupted by a Fulbright Fellowship in Rome (1954–55). He was appointed full professor of mathematics in 1957 at Madison and Rudolf E. Langer Professor of Mathematics in 1973. He was department chair 1970–72. He retired in 1980.

Wolfgang Wasow's main research area was singular perturbation theory. A classical application is the thin boundary layer that forms on a solid surface as a fluid flows over it. Above the boundary layer, the fluid behaves approximately like a perfect fluid. But within the boundary layer, the velocity of the flow changes rapidly from the high velocity above the boundary layer to a velocity of 0 at the solid surface. Many technical problems can be modeled this way, including the flow of a liquid through a pipe and the flow of air over an airplane wing. Boundary layer problems are instances of a more general class of problems that today is part of the field of singular perturbations.

Starting with his 1941 PhD thesis, Wasow was one of the main contributors to developing a mathematical theory of the boundary layer problem and singular perturbations. The organizers of a symposium in his honor at the Mathematics Research Center at Madison write:

In May 1980, the Mathematics Research Center organized a

successful Advanced Seminar on Singular Perturbations and Asymptotics in honor of the retirement of a colleague, Wolfgang R. Wasow. His fundamental research is responsible for many other rapid developments in this field since 1940, and continues to play a vital role in modern theory and current applications. Wasow's Ph.D. dissertation (N.Y.U., 1941) ... represents the starting point of this important flourish of modern applicable research. ... MRC is printing his 1941 thesis in its entirety ... Readers will note that the name "singular perturbations" (which was only coined several years later by K. O. Friedrichs or W. Wasow or possibly jointly, but neither is now able to recall the details) does not appear anywhere explicitly!

Wasow was "a substantial contributor to the study of singular perturbations for over twenty years". His textbook "Asymptotic expansions for ordinary differential equations" was the first "authoritative treatment" of the subject.

The Wolfgang Wasow Memorial Lecture, an annual lecture at the University of Wisconsin–Madison, was established in Wasow's honor by his children in 1993.

== Personal life ==
Wasow had three sons: Tom Wasow (linguist), Bernard Wasow (economist), and Oliver Wasow (artist). He also had two step-children.

Wolfgang Wasow self-published an autobiography for his family in 1986.
