= Ronald Kantowski =

Ronald Kantowski (18 December 1939) is a theoretical cosmologist, well known in the field of general relativity as the author, together with Rainer K. Sachs, of the Kantowski–Sachs dust solutions to the Einstein field equation. These are a widely used family of inhomogeneous cosmological models.

== Life and career ==
Kantowski received his Ph.D. in 1966 from the University of Texas at Austin, where he wrote a dissertation on cosmological models. He was a research scientist at the South West Center for Advanced Studies during 1967–1968. He was hired by the Physics & Astronomy department of the University of Oklahoma in 1968, where he became a full professor in 1981.

Besides the Kantowski–Sachs solutions to the Einstein's field equations, Kantowski's second widely recognized contribution to cosmology was developing the now used theory of transparent gravitational lenses. This theory was completed some four years before multiply imaged quasars were detected. There were only four papers written in all at that time. Kantowski was also among the first to study the distance-redshift relation in inhomogeneous Universe using Swiss cheese universe models.

His recent research has centered on issues of mass inhomogeneities and topological quantum field theories.

== Bibliography ==
- Kantowski, R. & Sachs, R. K. (1966). "Some spatially inhomogeneous dust models". Journal of Mathematical Physics. 7 (3): 443. Bibcode:1966JMP.....7..443K. doi:10.1063/1.1704952.
- Kantowski, R. (1969). "Corrections in the Luminosity-Redshift Relations of the Homogeneous Friedmann Models". The Astrophysical Journal. 155: 89. Bibcode:1969ApJ...155...89K. doi:10.1086/149851.
- Bourassa, R. R.; Kantowski, R. & Norton, T. D. (1973). "The Spheroidal Gravitational Lens". The Astrophysical Journal. 185: 74. Bibcode:1973ApJ...185..747B. doi:10.1086/152452.
- Cooke, James H.; Kantowski, R. (1975). "Time Delay for Multiply Imaged Quasars". The Astrophysical Journal. 195: 11. Bibcode:1975ApJ...195L..11C. doi:10.1086/181697.
- Bourassa, R. R.; Kantowski, R. (1975). "The Theory of Transparent Gravitational Lenses". The Astrophysical Journal. 195: 13. Bibcode:1975ApJ...195...13B. doi:10.1086/153300.
- Kantowski, R.; Vaughan, T.; Branch, D. (1995). "The Effects of Inhomogeneities on Evaluating the Deceleration Parameter Q 0". The Astrophysical Journal. 447: 35–42. arXiv:astro-ph/9511108. Bibcode:1995ApJ...447...35K. doi:10.1086/175854. S2CID 11392758.
- Kantowski, R; Chen, B; Dai, X (2010). "Gravitational Lensing Corrections in Flat ΛCDM Cosmology". The Astrophysical Journal. 718 (2): 913–919. arXiv:0909.3308. Bibcode:2010ApJ...718..913K. doi:10.1088/0004-637X/718/2/913. S2CID 6837577.
