= Texas Symposium on Relativistic Astrophysics =

Series of international scientific conferences

The Texas Symposium on Relativistic Astrophysics is an international scientific conference currently held once every two years, intended for astronomers, astrophysicists, and other researchers interested in general relativity and its implications. These gatherings helped end the insularity of the specialists of these diverse subjects and marked the rise of modern astrophysics as a multidisciplinary area of research. Today, these Symposia are among the most well-known in the domain of gravitational physics. They originally met in Texas, United States. But they proved highly successful that they were later held in many other places internationally, retaining the name. A typical Texas Symposium has hundreds of attendees from around the world. Ivor Robinson, one of the organizers of the first few Symposia, likely coined the term "relativistic astrophysics" in 1963. Historians of science commonly mark the First Texas Symposium as the birth of the field.

== History ==
Judging from the quantities of scholarly activities, general relativity only entered the mainstream of research after the Second World War. During the postwar decades, the growth of publications in general relativity was enormous, faster than the overall (exponential) increase in physics as a whole. The advent of Space Age, marked by the launch of Sputnik, the world's first artificial satellite, in 1957; the rise of radio, X-ray, and gamma-ray astronomy; and the parallels between the physics of (nuclear) explosives and supernovae—shock waves, massive energy outputs, and the synthesis of heavy elements—fueled the growth of astronomy and astrophysics. An increase in the number of researchers and funding in the postwar years also played a role. Many physicists of the era recognized the need for collaboration across the domains of physics, both observational and theoretical, and for synthesizing different bodies of knowledge. This represented a pragmatic alternative to the more speculative approach towards a unified field theory on the basis of first principles. The U.S. Air Force and Navy provided funding for some the early conferences, but stopped doing so after Congress passed the Mansfield Amendments, forbidding the use of the defense budget on basic research. The Texas Symposia were put in this category, despite the relevance of relativistic physics for missile guidance and the functioning of the Global Positioning System (GPS). Up until the late 1960s the American military provided almost a fifth of the a funding for basic research, including 40 percent for physics. Over the years, some of the recurring topics of interest at the Texas Symposia have been astroparticle physics; the cosmic microwave background; extra-galactic gamma-ray bursts; gravitational waves; black holes, their thermodynamics, and Hawking radiation; pulsars; and X-ray astronomy.

=== Twentieth century ===
The First Symposium, chiefly organized by Robinson, Alfred Schild, Engelbert Schücking, and Peter Bergmann, convened in Dallas, Texas, in December 16–18, 1963, shortly after the assassination of John F. Kennedy. Some of the scientists invited thought that it would be disrespectful to hold a meeting so soon after the tragedy while others feared for their safety. But the mayor of Dallas sent them telegrams asking them to come regardless.

One of the major topic of discussion of the time was the optical and radio observations of quasi-stellar objects. J. Robert Oppenheimer opened the first session on what would later be named "black holes" by John Archibald Wheeler. Wheeler gave an extensive lecture on the gravitational collapse of stars, and expressed his enthusiasm for the Oppenheimer–Snyder model. Another notable speaker was Roy Kerr, who gave a brief talk on his newfound exact solution to the Einstein field equations. With the notable exception of Achilles Papapetrou, most physicists did not grasp its significance. But they later realized that the Kerr metric described rotating black holes. It was in fact the key to understanding quasars. Hong-Yee Chiu used the word quasar for quasi-stellar radio sources (QSRS) in the proceedings of this conference, published in 1965, though it took some time to become standard. The First Symposium attracted approximately 300 people from many different countries worldwide. However, against the backdrop of the Cold War, a number of physicists from the Soviet Union, such as Vitaly Ginzburg and Yakov Zeldovich, were not able to attend due to a ban from their own government or their inability to obtain a visa to visit the United States. The gathering was sponsored by Texas Instruments, the RAND Corporation, Lockheed, Boeing, among others. In his after-dinner speech, Thomas Gold commented on the significance of this conference: "...the relativists with their sophisticated works are not only magnificent cultural ornaments but might actually be useful to science! Everyone is pleased: the relativists who feel they are being appreciated and are experts in a field they hardly knew existed, the astrophysicists for having enlarged their domain, their empire, by the annexation of another subject—general relativity."

The Second Symposium convened at the University of Texas at Austin in December 15–19, 1964. Discussions of quasars continued, now with astronomical observations at various portions of the electromagnetic spectrum, including X-rays and gamma-rays. Astronomers exhibited their discoveries on highly energetic cosmic rays, such as neutrinos. Robert Dicke presented his improved Eötvös experiment, verifying the principle of equivalence to one part in 10^{11}. The Symposium concluded with a seminar on gravitational collapse, the energy released from such an event, and the relevance of relativistic hydrodynamics in the strong-field regime.

At the Fifth Symposium in Austin, Texas, in 1970, the biggest topics were black holes, theorems concerning gravitational singularities, specific results by Stephen Hawking, Werner Israel, and Brandon Carter that could be generalized for a rotating electrically charged black hole, and energy extraction from rotating black holes. Participants also discussed active galactic nuclei; pulsars; alternatives to general relativity (especially the Brans–Dicke and other scalar–tensor theories) and null results in their experimental tests; the post-Newtonian expansion; and white holes. Hawking attended in his wheelchair. He first presented his prediction that the area of a black hole could never decrease at this conference, a property reminiscent of entropy.

By the time of the Sixth Symposium in New York City, 1972, black holes had become a major topic of study. Researchers presented their work on X-ray binaries, accretion disks, and Cygnus X-1, the first black-hole candidate. As of 2011, this Symposium was one of the most popular of all time, attended by around 1,000 people.

The Seventh Symposium, organized in Dallas, 1974, saw the first scheduled parallel sessions. Some major topics of interest were the abundance of the chemical elements, gamma-ray bursts, supernovae, galaxies, compact objects, and gravitational waves.

Jocelyn Bell Burnell, co-discoverer of pulsars, gave an after-dinner speech on her work at the Eighth Symposium in Boston, Massachusetts, in 1976, at the invitation of Thomas Gold. Other highlights of this conference were discussions of supernovae and stellar collapse; thermodynamics and quantum field theory in curved spacetime; X-ray astronomy; the Hubble expansion; neutron stars; supergravity; and the use of computers in numerical relativity.

At the Ninth Symposium in Munich, Germany, in 1978, the newly discovered Hulse–Taylor pulsar, named after Russell Alan Hulse and Joseph Hooton Taylor Jr., attracted considerable attention as a test of general relativity outside of the solar system in the post-Newtonian limit. The observed orbital decay due to gravitational radiation and precession of the periastron were accurately predicted by general relativity. This was the first Texas Symposium held in Europe. More than 800 people were in attendance.

Gravitational waves were a major topic at the Fourteen Symposium in Chicago, Illinois, in 1986. Kip Thorne shared his plans for what later became the Laser Interferometer Gravitational-Wave Observatory (LIGO). Bernard Schultz examined how gravitational collapses, such as supernovae, as potential sources of gravitational waves and the prospects of detecting them by Weber bars (invented by Joseph Weber). Other notable topics were active galactic nuclei; gravitational lenses and how they could be used to map the distribution of dark matter and to determine the Hubble constant; anisotropy in the cosmic microwave background and the upcoming Cosmic Background Explorer (COBE) satellite; and NASA's Great Observatories program.

By the 1990s, a large public lecture in the evening has become a standard feature. Stephen Hawking gave this talk at the Fifteenth Symposium in Brighton, United Kingdom, 1990.

=== Twenty-first century ===
The Twenty-Sixth Symposium took place in São Paulo, Brazil, in 2012. It was the first to be held in Latin America.

The Twenty-Seventh Symposium returned to Dallas for the 50th anniversary of the First. This event featured a round table of the "veterans" of the original conference, co-chaired by Wolfgang Rindler. Other sessions discussed the evolution of galaxies, neutron stars, supermassive black holes, the implications of the Higgs boson for cosmology, plus updates from the Planck satellite and the Nuclear Spectroscopic Telescope Array (NuSTAR).

The Twenty-Eighth Symposium met in Geneva, Switzerland, in 2015, commemorating the 100th anniversary of the completion of general relativity by Albert Einstein. Among the plenary speakers, Thanu Padmanabhan spoke of the first century of general relativity, Mustapha Ishak of the exact solutions to the Einstein field equations having applications in astrophysics, Alessandra Buonanno of gravitational waves emitted by binary systems, and Anna Watts of the equation of state for neutron stars. Further evidence of frame dragging from the XMM-Newton X-ray space telescope was discussed.

The Thirty-Second Symposium was held in Shanghai, China, at the Tsung-Dao Lee Institute of Shanghai Jiao Tong University in 2023. Shanghai is the first East Asian city to host the conference. It took place on the 60th anniversary of the First Symposium. Kip Thorne gave the opening speech online. (See link below.)

At the Thirty-Third Symposium, organized by Arizona State University in Tempe, Arizona, in 2025, plenary talks focused on the imaging of black holes using the Event Horizon Telescope, gravitational-wave astronomy, observations by the James Webb Space Telescope, little red dots, and the Hubble tension.

== See also ==
- Chapel Hill Conference
- Shelter Island Conference
- Timeline of gravitational physics and relativity
- Multi-messenger astronomy
- Neutrino astronomy
