= V. Joseph =

V. Joseph may refer to:

- Valentine Joseph (1929–2017), Sri Lankan mathematician, noted for his contributions to education
- V. J. Sabu Joseph (born 1981), film editor
- V. J. Bella (born 1927), former member of the Louisiana House of Representatives
- V. Joseph Thomas (1941–2018), Director General of Kerala Police in India
- V. K. Joseph, Indian film critic
