= Ehlers–Geren–Sachs theorem =

Physics theory

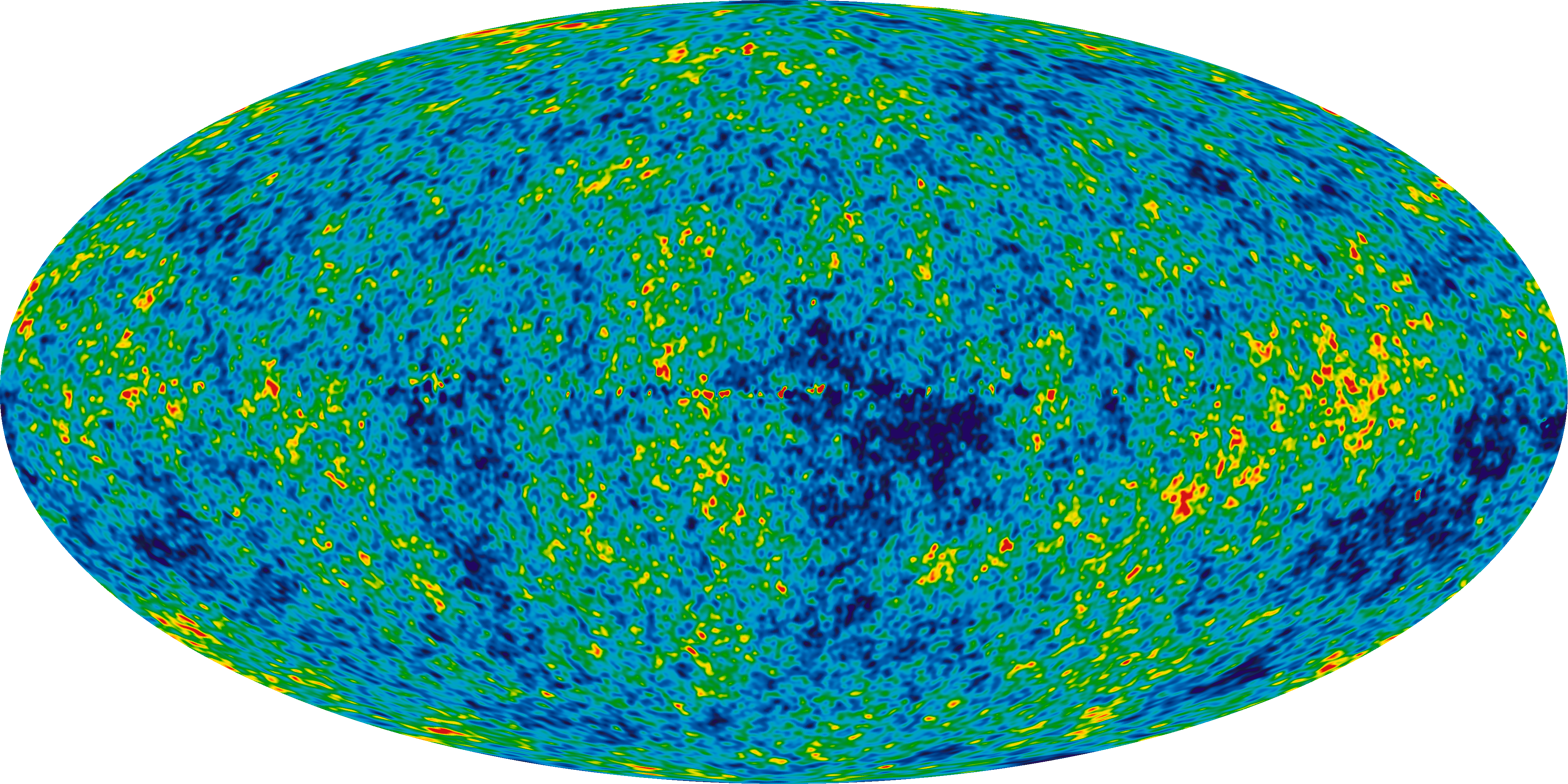
The inhomogeneities in the temperature of the cosmic background radiation recorded in this image from the satellite probe WMAP amount to no more than 10^{−4} kelvins.

The Ehlers–Geren–Sachs theorem, published in 1968 by Jürgen Ehlers, P. Geren and Rainer K. Sachs, shows that if, in a given universe, all freely falling observers measure the cosmic background radiation to have exactly the same properties in all directions (that is, they measure the background radiation to be isotropic), then that universe is an isotropic and homogeneous FLRW spacetime, if the one uses a kinetic picture and the collision term vanishes, i.e. in the so-called Vlasov case or if there is a so-called detailed balance. This result was later extended to the full Boltzmann case by R. Treciokas and G. F. R. Ellis.

Using the fact that, as measured from Earth, the cosmic microwave background is indeed highly isotropic—the temperature characterizing this thermal radiation varies only by tenth of thousandth of a kelvin with the direction of observations—and making the Copernican assumption that Earth does not occupy a privileged cosmic position, this constitutes the strongest available evidence for our own universe's homogeneity and isotropy, and hence for the foundation of current standard cosmological models. Strictly speaking, this conclusion has a potential flaw. While the Ehlers–Geren–Sachs theorem concerns only exactly isotropic measurements, it is known that the background radiation does have minute irregularities. This was addressed by a generalization published in 1995 by W. R. Stoeger, Roy Maartens and George Ellis, which shows that an analogous result holds for observers who measure a nearly isotropic background radiation, and can justly infer to live in a nearly FLRW universe. However the paper by Stoeger et al. assumes that derivatives of the cosmic background temperature multipoles are bounded in terms of the multipoles themselves. The derivatives of the multipoles are not directly accessible to us and would require observations over time and space intervals on cosmological scales. In 1999 John Wainwright, M. J. Hancock and Claes Uggla show a counterexample in the non-tilted perfect fluid case. Thus an almost isotropic cosmic microwave temperature does not imply an almost isotropic universe. Using the methods of Wainwright et al. Ho Lee, Ernesto Nungesser and John Stalker could show that they can be applied to Vlasov as well, which was the original matter model of the EGS-theorem.
