= Newton–Cartan theory =

Geometrical re-formulation of Newtonian gravity

Newton–Cartan theory (or geometrized Newtonian gravitation) is a geometrical re-formulation, as well as a generalization, of Newtonian gravity first introduced by Élie Cartan in 1923 and Kurt Friedrichs and later developed by G. Dautcourt, W. G. Dixon, P. Havas, H. Künzle, Andrzej Trautman, and others. In this re-formulation, the structural similarities between Newton's theory and Albert Einstein's general theory of relativity are readily seen, and it has been used by Cartan and Friedrichs to give a rigorous formulation of the way in which Newtonian gravity can be seen as a specific limit of general relativity, and by Jürgen Ehlers to extend this correspondence to specific solutions of general relativity.

== Classical spacetimes ==
In Newton–Cartan theory, one starts with a smooth four-dimensional manifold $M$ and defines two (degenerate) metrics. A temporal metric $t_{ab}$ with signature $(1, 0, 0, 0)$, used to assign temporal lengths to vectors on $M$ and a spatial metric $h^{ab}$ with signature $(0, 1, 1, 1)$. One also requires that these two metrics satisfy a transversality (or "orthogonality") condition, $h^{ab}t_{bc}=0$. Thus, one defines a classical spacetime as an ordered quadruple $(M, t_{ab}, h^{ab}, \nabla)$, where $t_{ab}$ and $h^{ab}$ are as described, $\nabla$ is a metrics-compatible covariant derivative operator; and the metrics satisfy the orthogonality condition. One might say that a classical spacetime is the analog of a relativistic spacetime $(M, g_{ab})$, where $g_{ab}$ is a smooth Lorentzian metric on the manifold $M$.

== Geometric formulation of Poisson's equation ==
In Newton's theory of gravitation, Poisson's equation reads

$$\Delta U = 4 \pi G \rho \,$$

where $U$ is the gravitational potential, $G$ is the gravitational constant and $\rho$ is the mass density. The weak equivalence principle motivates a geometric version of the equation of motion for a point particle in the potential $U$

$$m_t \, \ddot{\vec x} = - m_g {\vec \nabla} U$$

where $m_t$ is the inertial mass and $m_g$ the gravitational mass. Since, according to the weak equivalence principle $m_t = m_g$, the corresponding equation of motion

$$\ddot{\vec x} = - {\vec \nabla} U$$

no longer contains a reference to the mass of the particle. Following the idea that the solution of the equation then is a property of the curvature of space, a connection is constructed so that the geodesic equation

$$\frac{d^2 x^\lambda}{d s^2} + \Gamma_{\mu \nu}^\lambda \frac{d x^\mu}{d s}\frac{d x^\nu}{d s} = 0$$

represents the equation of motion of a point particle in the potential $U$. The resulting connection is

$$\Gamma_{\mu \nu}^{\lambda} = \gamma^{\lambda \rho} U_{, \rho} \Psi_\mu \Psi_\nu$$

with $\Psi_\mu = \delta_\mu^0$ and $\gamma^{\mu \nu} = \delta^\mu_A \delta^\nu_B \delta^{AB}$ ($A, B = 1,2,3$). The connection has been constructed in one inertial system but can be shown to be valid in any inertial system by showing the invariance of $\Psi_\mu$ and $\gamma^{\mu \nu}$ under Galilei-transformations. The Riemann curvature tensor in inertial system coordinates of this connection is then given by

$$R^\lambda_{\kappa \mu \nu} = 2 \gamma^{\lambda \sigma} U_{, \sigma [ \mu}\Psi_{\nu]}\Psi_\kappa$$

where the brackets $A_{[\mu \nu]} = \frac{1}{2!} [ A_{\mu \nu} - A_{\nu \mu} ]$ mean the antisymmetric combination of the tensor $A_{\mu \nu}$. The Ricci tensor is given by

$$R_{\kappa \nu} = \Delta U \Psi_{\kappa}\Psi_{\nu} \,$$

which leads to following geometric formulation of Poisson's equation

$$R_{\mu \nu} = 4 \pi G \rho \Psi_\mu \Psi_\nu$$

More explicitly, if the roman indices i and j range over the spatial coordinates 1, 2, 3, then the connection is given by

$$\Gamma^i_{00} = U_{,i}$$

the Riemann curvature tensor by

$$R^i_{0j0} = -R^i_{00j} = U_{,ij}$$

and the Ricci tensor and Ricci scalar by

$$R = R_{00} = \Delta U$$

where all components not listed equal zero.

Note that this formulation does not require introducing the concept of a metric: the connection alone gives all the physical information.

== Bargmann lift ==
It was shown that four-dimensional Newton–Cartan theory of gravitation can be reformulated as Kaluza–Klein reduction of five-dimensional Einstein gravity along a null-like direction. This lifting is considered to be useful for non-relativistic holographic models.

== Bibliography ==
- Cartan, Élie (1923), "Sur les variétés à connexion affine et la théorie de la relativité généralisée (Première partie)" (PDF), Annales Scientifiques de l'École Normale Supérieure, 40: 325, doi:10.24033/asens.751
- Cartan, Élie (1924), "Sur les variétés à connexion affine, et la théorie de la relativité généralisée (Première partie) (Suite)" (PDF), Annales Scientifiques de l'École Normale Supérieure, 41: 1, doi:10.24033/asens.753
- Cartan, Élie (1955), Œuvres complètes, vol. III/1, Gauthier-Villars, pp. 659, 799
- Renn, Jürgen; Schemmel, Matthias, eds. (2007), The Genesis of General Relativity, vol. 4, Springer, pp. 1107–1129 (English translation of Ann. Sci. Éc. Norm. Supér. #40 paper)
- Chapter 1 of Ehlers, Jürgen (1973), "Survey of general relativity theory", in Israel, Werner (ed.), Relativity, Astrophysics and Cosmology, D. Reidel, pp. 1–125, ISBN 90-277-0369-8
