= Leonard Sarason =

American composer, a pianist, and, mathematician

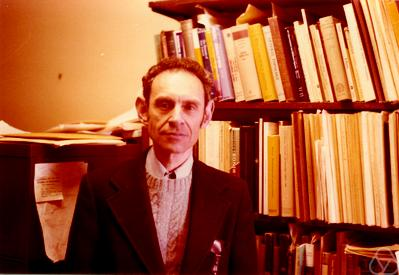
Leonard Sarason in 1977

Leonard Sarason (1925 – September 24, 1994) was a music composer, a pianist, and a mathematician. He earned a master's degree music composition from Yale University, supervised by Paul Hindemith. After a doctorate in Mathematics at New York University supervised by Kurt Otto Friedrichs he taught mathematics at Stanford University and the University of Washington. His mathematical research concerned partial differential equations.

== Media ==
- Piano Sonata (1948)

Piano Sonata (1948) 1 Scherzo
performed by Martha Goldstein

Piano Sonata (1948) 2 Allegro
performed by Martha Goldstein

Piano Sonata (1948) 3 Slow _and Espressivo
performed by Martha Goldstein
