= Engelbert Schücking =

American physicist (1926–2015)

- Born: May 23, 1926; Hörde, Westphalia
- Died: January 5, 2015 (aged 88); Manhattan, New York
- Education: University of Hamburg
- Scientific career
- Fields: Physics
- Workplaces: New York University
- Doctoral advisor: Pascual Jordan

Engelbert Levin Schücking (May 23, 1926 – January 5, 2015), in English-language works often cited as E. L. Schucking, was a physics professor at New York University in New York City. His research interests were theoretical astrophysics, general relativity, and cosmology.

== Biography ==
Engelbert Levin Schücking was born on May 23, 1926, in Hörde, Westphalia. He manifested an interest in astronomy at a very early age, and by the age of fourteen, he was actively engaged in counting sunspots. He then studied mathematics and physics at the University of Münster, and later at Göttingen. His professors included prolific physicists Werner Heisenberg, Richard Becker, and Robert Pohl. He started working in the field of general relativity with the great German physicist Pascual Jordan in Hamburg, in 1952, and he earned his PhD there in 1955. It is with P. Jordan that he found the locus of his life's work, namely the geometric aspects of general relativity and Einstein's field equations. He moved to the US in 1961, where he became a Research associate, first at Syracuse, then at Cornell. He moved to the University of Texas at Austin in 1962, where he became Professor of Physics. There, he started a group working on general relativity, comprising such first-rate physicists as Roger Penrose, Roy Kerr, Rainer K. Sachs, and Jürgen Ehlers. In 1967, he was appointed as Professor of Physics at New York University, where he had many students, including some twenty successful PhD candidates. Some of these students went on to become famous specialists in the field of general relativity: Eli Honig, Richard Greene, and C. V. Vishveshwara, to name but a few.

He published numerous papers and co-authored many books about gravitation, cosmology, as well as black holes. In December 1996 a symposium was held in his honor at New York University.

He died at the age of 88 on January 5, 2015, surrounded by family and friends in his Manhattan apartment in New York City, NY.
