= Hungdah Chiu =

Taiwanese legal scholar (1936–2011)

- 丘宏達
- Born: March 23, 1936; Shanghai, China
- Died: April 12, 2011 (aged 75); Washington, D.C., U.S.
- Education: National Taiwan University (LLB); Long Island University (MA); Harvard University (LLM, SJD)
- Political party: Kuomintang

Academic work
- Discipline: International law
- Institutions: University of Maryland
- Influenced: Ma Ying-jeou

Hungdah Chiu
- Traditional Chinese: 丘宏達
- Simplified Chinese: 丘宏达
Transcriptions
Standard Mandarin
- Hanyu Pinyin: Qiū Hóngdá
- Bopomofo: ㄑㄧㄡㄏㄨㄥˊㄉㄚˊ
- Wade–Giles: Ch’iu Hung-ta
Southern Min
- Hokkien POJ: Khu Hông-ta̍t

Hungdah Chiu (Chinese: 丘宏達; pinyin: Qiū Hóngdá; March 23, 1936 – April 12, 2011) was a Taiwanese legal scholar who was a professor of law at the University of Maryland Francis King Carey School of Law. He was the president of the Association of Chinese Social Scientists in North America (1984–86) and president of the American Association for Chinese Studies (1985–87). From 1993 to 1994, he served as a minister without portfolio in the Executive Yuan. He was also the president of the International Law Association from 1998 to 2000.

== Early life and education ==
Chiu was born in Shanghai on March 23, 1936, to a prominent political family affiliated with the Kuomintang (KMT). His eldest brother, Qiu Hong-ren, was a political dissident in Taiwan. Another brother, Hong-Yee Chiu, became an astrophysicist. Their father, Qiu Han-ping, was a law professor who graduated from Soochow University, earned his doctorate from George Washington University, and served as a KMT legislator. The family moved to Taiwan in 1949 during the Great Retreat.

After high school, Chiu studied law at National Taiwan University (NTU), where he was a student of law professor Peng Ming-min and a classmate of Chen Lung-chu. After graduating from NTU with a Bachelor of Laws (LL.B.) in 1958, he went to the United States and obtained a Master of Arts (M.A.) in political science from Long Island University in 1962. He then pursued doctoral studies at Harvard University, where he earned a Master of Laws (LL.M.) in 1962 and his Doctor of Juridical Science (S.J.D.) in 1965 from Harvard Law School.

At Harvard, Chiu was classmates with U.S. Senator Elizabeth Dole (the daughter of Senator Bob Dole) and Randle Edwards, who became an endowed professor of law at Columbia University. He completed his doctoral thesis on public international law in 1964 under law professor Louis B. Sohn. His dissertation was titled, "The capacity of international organizations to conclude treaties, and the special legal aspects of the treaties so concluded".

== Career ==
After receiving his doctorate from Harvard, Chiu was a research associate at Harvard Law School from 1966 to 1970. During this time, he became a close associate of Professor Jerome A. Cohen. He then returned to Taiwan and was a professor of law at National Chengchi University from 1970 to 1972, where he played a key role in establishing The Chengchi Law Review, the first academic legal journal in Taiwan. In 1971, he was selected as one of the “Ten Outstanding Young Persons” of the Republic of China and served in the same year as Honorary President of the reformist journal University. He left the university in 1972 and worked as a research associate at Harvard Law School from 1972 to 1974, then became an associate professor at the University of Maryland Francis King Carey School of Law. By the end of his career, he had published at least 27 books in English and Chinese and more than 130 journal articles, the most of any law professor at the University of Maryland. In 1974, he was appointed as a professor at the University of Maryland School of Law. He later served as the Director of the East Asian Legal Studies Program and was awarded the title of Professor Emeritus. He also served as the editor-in-chief of the Occasional Papers/Reprints Series in Contemporary Asian Studies published by the law school.

Even after moving to the United States, he remained actively engaged in political discourse concerning Taiwan’s national affairs. He was recognized by President Chiang Ching-kuo and Premier Sun Yun-suan for his insights and was invited multiple times to return to Taiwan to participate in National Development Conferences. He was one of the first scholars to publicly advocate for the lifting of martial law and played a role in the reform to protect the Taiwanese movement, contributing significantly to Taiwan’s democratization.

Chiu was a pro-democracy advocate during the period of martial law in Taiwan.

=== Government and quasi-official experience ===
Qiu once served as a member of the Preparatory Committee for the National Affairs Conference (1990), a research fellow of the National Unification Council (1990), Minister without Portfolio of the Executive Yuan (1993–1994), board member of the Straits Exchange Foundation, member of the National Unification Council (1995–2000), Ambassador-at-Large of the Ministry of Foreign Affairs (1998–2000), and board member of the Chiang Ching-kuo Foundation for International Scholarly Exchange.

=== Experience and Publications in International Law ===
Qiu held a prestigious position in the field of international law. From 1993 to 1999, he served as President of the Chinese Society of International Law. In recognition of his contributions to the public international law and issues of sovereignty over international maritime areas, he was nominated in 1998 as a candidate for Academician of Academia Sinica. From 1998 to 2000, Qiu served as President of the International Law Association (ILA). During his tenure, he successfully brought the Association’s 125th Anniversary Conference to Taipei in 1998. On this occasion, he, together with International Court of Justice Judge Shigeru Oda and several judges from the International Tribunal for the Law of the Sea, as well as renowned legal scholars and experts from around the world, paid a formal visit to President Lee Teng-hui of the Republic of China. The delegation was received with official banquets hosted by President Lee, Premier Vincent Siew, Minister of Foreign Affairs Jason Hu, and Minister of the Government Information Office Cheng Chien-jen. Upon the completion of his term, Professor Qiu was elected Permanent and Honorary Vice President of the ILA. Throughout his life, he strongly advocated for students to engage deeply with international law cases relevant to their own nation, emphasizing the importance of connecting legal study with national context.

Qiu served as editor-in-chief of the Chinese and English editions of the Yearbook of Chinese International Law and International Affairs for over 30 years. Beginning in 1981, he took on the role of editor-in-chief of the revised edition, the Chinese Yearbook of International Law and Affairs. Since 1987, he had continued in this capacity for the yearbook. His publications have been collected by the U.S. Library of Congress, the U.S. Department of State Library, and the law libraries of major universities around the world.

== Personal life ==
His father, Qiu Han-ping, held a Bachelor of Law degree from Soochow University and a Doctor of Laws (LL.D.) from George Washington University in the United States. He was a lawyer and legal scholar, and after the Constitution of the Republic of China came into effect, he served as a member of the Legislative Yuan. In 1951, he became the principal of the Soochow Evening School, the predecessor of Soochow University's reestablishment in Taiwan.

His eldest brother, Qiu Hong-ren, was imprisoned during his third year at Chenggong High School for involvement in the April 6 Incident. While in his first year at National Taiwan University, he was arrested again on charges of sedition. During the trial, his maternal aunt, Liu Yang, who had previously posted bail on his behalf, suddenly appeared in court and declared that the responsibility was too burdensome and requested to withdraw her guarantee. Upon the judge’s decision to take him back into custody, Qiu Hong-ren jumped out of a courtroom window, sustaining critical injuries. He was rushed to the hospital but died shortly after. His family regarded the incident as a tragedy resulting from political interference.

Chiu died in Washington, D.C., on April 12, 2011. His wife, Hsieh Yuan-yuan (謝元元), worked at the Food and Drug Administration (FDA). Although he lived in the United States for approximately 50 years, Chiu never became a naturalized U.S. citizen.

== Awards and honors ==
- Order of Brilliant Star 1st Class with Special Grand Cordon
