= Fluid solution =

Class of exact solutions to Einstein's field equations

In general relativity, a fluid solution is an exact solution of the Einstein field equation in which the gravitational field is produced entirely by the mass, momentum, and stress density of a fluid.

In astrophysics, fluid solutions are often employed as stellar models, since a perfect gas can be thought of as a special case of a perfect fluid. In cosmology, fluid solutions are often used as cosmological models.

== Mathematical definition ==
The stress–energy tensor of a relativistic fluid can be written in the form

$$T^{\mu\nu} = \rho \, u^\mu \, u^\nu + p \, h^{\mu\nu} + \left( u^\mu \, q^\nu + q^\mu \, u^\nu \right) + \pi^{\mu\nu}$$

Here

- the world lines of the fluid elements are the integral curves of the velocity vector $u^\mu$,
- the projection tensor $h_{\mu\nu} = g_{\mu\nu} + u_\mu \, u_\nu$ projects other tensors onto hyperplane elements orthogonal to $u^\mu$,
- the matter density is given by the scalar function $\rho$,
- the pressure is given by the scalar function $p$,
- the heat flux vector is given by $q^\mu$,
- the viscous shear tensor is given by $\pi^{\mu\nu}$.

The heat flux vector and viscous shear tensor are transverse to the world lines, in the sense that

$$q_\mu \, u^\mu = 0, \; \; \pi_{\mu\nu} \, u^\nu = 0$$

This means that they are effectively three-dimensional quantities, and since the viscous stress tensor is symmetric and traceless, they have respectively three and five linearly independent components. Together with the density and pressure, this makes a total of 10 linearly independent components, which is the number of linearly independent components in a four-dimensional symmetric rank two tensor.

== Special cases ==
Several special cases of fluid solutions are noteworthy (here speed of light c = 1 and the metric sign convention used is $g_{\mu\nu} = \operatorname{diag}(-1,1,1,1)$):

- A perfect fluid has vanishing viscous shear and vanishing heat flux:

$$T^{\mu\nu} = (\rho + p) \, u^\mu \, u^\nu + p \, g^{\mu\nu},$$

- A dust is a pressureless perfect fluid:

$$T^{\mu\nu} = \rho \, u^\mu \, u^\nu,$$

- A radiation fluid is a perfect fluid with $\rho = 3p$:

$$T^{\mu\nu} = p \, \left( 4 \, u^\mu \, u^\nu + \, g^{\mu\nu} \right).$$

The last two are often used as cosmological models for (respectively) matter-dominated and radiation-dominated epochs. Notice that while in general it requires ten functions to specify a fluid, a perfect fluid requires only two, and dusts and radiation fluids each require only one function. It is much easier to find such solutions than it is to find a general fluid solution.

Among the perfect fluids other than dusts or radiation fluids, by far the most important special case is that of the static spherically symmetric perfect fluid solutions. These can always be matched to a Schwarzschild vacuum across a spherical surface, so they can be used as interior solutions in a stellar model. In such models, the sphere $r = r[0]$ where the fluid interior is matched to the vacuum exterior is the surface of the star, and the pressure must vanish in the limit as the radius approaches $r_0$. However, the density can be nonzero in the limit from below, while of course it is zero in the limit from above. In recent years, several surprisingly simple schemes have been given for obtaining all these solutions.

== Einstein tensor ==
The components of a tensor computed with respect to a frame field rather than the coordinate basis are often called physical components, because these are the components which can (in principle) be measured by an observer.

In the special case of a perfect fluid, an adapted frame

$$\vec{e}_0, \; \vec{e}_1, \; \vec{e}_2, \; \vec{e}_3$$

(the first is a timelike unit vector field, the last three are spacelike unit vector fields) can always be found in which the Einstein tensor takes the simple form

$$G^{\widehat{\mu\,}\widehat{\nu\,}} = 8 \pi \, \left[ \begin{matrix} \rho &0&0&0\\0&p&0&0\\0&0&p&0\\0&0&0&p\end{matrix} \right]$$

where $\rho$ is the energy density and $p$ is the pressure of the fluid. Here, the timelike unit vector field $\vec{e}_0$ is everywhere tangent to the world lines of observers who are comoving with the fluid elements, so the density and pressure just mentioned are those measured by comoving observers. These are the same quantities which appear in the general coordinate basis expression given in the preceding section; to see this, just put $\vec{u} = \vec{e}_0$. From the form of the physical components, it is easy to see that the isotropy group of any perfect fluid is isomorphic to the three dimensional Lie group SO(3), the ordinary rotation group.

The fact that these results are exactly the same for curved spacetimes as for hydrodynamics in flat Minkowski spacetime is an expression of the equivalence principle.

== Eigenvalues ==
The characteristic polynomial of the Einstein tensor in a perfect fluid must have the form

$$\chi(\lambda) = \left( \lambda - 8 \pi \rho \right) \, \left( \lambda-8 \pi p \right)^3$$

where $\rho, \, p$ are again the density and pressure of the fluid as measured by observers comoving with the fluid elements. (Notice that these quantities can vary within the fluid.) Writing this out and applying Gröbner basis methods to simplify the resulting algebraic relations, we find that the coefficients of the characteristic must satisfy the following two algebraically independent (and invariant) conditions:

$$12 a_4 + a_2^2 - 3 a_1 a_3 = 0$$
$$a_1 a_2 a_3 - 9 a_3^2 - 9 a_1^2 a_4 + 32 a_2 a_4 = 0$$

But according to Newton's identities, the traces of the powers of the Einstein tensor are related to these coefficients as follows:

$${G^a}_a = t_1 = a_1$$
$${G^a}_b \, {G^b}_a = t_2 = a_1^2 - 2 a_2$$
$${G^a}_b \, {G^b}_c \, {G^c}_a = t_3 = a_1^3 - 3 a_1 a_2 + 3 a_3$$
$${G^a}_b \, {G^b}_c \, {G^c}_d \, {G^d}_a = t_4 = a_1^4 - 4 a_1^2 a_2 + 4 a_1 a_3 + 2 a_2^2 - a_4$$

so we can rewrite the above two quantities entirely in terms of the traces of the powers. These are obviously scalar invariants, and they must vanish identically in the case of a perfect fluid solution:

$$t_2^3 + 4 t_3^2 + t_1^2 t_4 - 4 t_2 t_4 - 2 t_1 t_2 t_3 = 0$$
$$t_1^4 + 7 t_2^2- 8 t_1^2 t_2 + 12 t_1 t_3 - 12 t_4 = 0$$

Notice that this assumes nothing about any possible equation of state relating the pressure and density of the fluid; we assume only that we have one simple and one triple eigenvalue.

In the case of a dust solution (vanishing pressure), these conditions simplify considerably:

$$a_2 \, = a_3 = a_4 = 0$$

or

$$t_2 = t_1^2, \; \; t_3 = t_1^3, \; \; t_4 = t_1^4$$

In tensor gymnastics notation, this can be written using the Ricci scalar as:

$${G^a}_a = -R$$
$${G^a}_b \, {G^b}_a = R^2$$
$${G^a}_b \, {G^b}_c \, {G^c}_a = -R^3$$
$${G^a}_b \, {G^b}_c \, {G^c}_d \, {G^d}_a = -R^4$$

In the case of a radiation fluid, the criteria become

$$a_1 = 0, \; 27 \, a_3^2 + 8 a_2^3 = 0, \; 12 \, a_4 + a_2^2 = 0$$

or

$$t_1 = 0, 7 \, t_3^2 - t_2 \, t_4 = 0, \; 12 \, t_4 - 7 \, t_2^2 = 0$$

In using these criteria, one must be careful to ensure that the largest eigenvalue belongs to a timelike eigenvector, since there are Lorentzian manifolds, satisfying this eigenvalue criterion, in which the large eigenvalue belongs to a spacelike eigenvector, and these cannot represent radiation fluids.

The coefficients of the characteristic will often appear very complicated, and the traces are not much better; when looking for solutions it is almost always better to compute components of the Einstein tensor with respect to a suitably adapted frame and then to kill appropriate combinations of components directly. However, when no adapted frame is evident, these eigenvalue criteria can be sometimes be useful, especially when employed in conjunction with other considerations.

These criteria can often be useful for spot checking alleged perfect fluid solutions, in which case the coefficients of the characteristic are often much simpler than they would be for a simpler imperfect fluid.

== Examples ==
Noteworthy individual dust solutions are listed in the article on dust solutions. Noteworthy perfect fluid solutions which feature positive pressure include various radiation fluid models from cosmology, including

- FRW radiation fluids, often referred to as the radiation-dominated FRW models.

In addition to the family of static spherically symmetric perfect fluids, noteworthy rotating fluid solutions include

- Wahlquist fluid, which has similar symmetries to the Kerr vacuum, leading to initial hopes (since dashed) that it might provide the interior solution for a simple model of a rotating star.

== See also ==
- Dust solution, for the important special case of dust solutions,
- Exact solutions in general relativity, for exact solutions in general,
- Lorentz group
- Perfect fluid, for perfect fluids in physics in general,
- Relativistic disks, for the interpretation of relativistic disks in terms of perfect fluids.
