= Alfred Schild =

Austrian-American physicist (1921–1977)

- Born: September 7, 1921; Istanbul, Turkey
- Died: May 24, 1977 (aged 55); Downer's Grove, Illinois
- Education: University of Toronto
- Known for: Kerr–Schild perturbations; Texas Symposium on Relativistic Astrophysics
- Scientific career
- Fields: Mathematical physics
- Workplaces: University of Texas at Austin
- Doctoral advisor: Leopold Infeld

Alfred Schild (September 7, 1921 – May 24, 1977) was a leading Austrian-American physicist, who contributed to the golden age of general relativity (1960–1975).

== Biography ==
Schild was born in Istanbul on September 7, 1921. His parents were German-speaking Viennese Jews, but his early education was in England. Upon the outbreak of World War II Schild was interned as an enemy alien, but later allowed to travel to Canada. In 1944 he earned his B.A. at the University of Toronto, and in 1946 completed his doctorate under the direction of Leopold Infeld. Schild spent the next eleven years at the Carnegie Institute of Technology, where he helped to develop the first atomic clocks.

As tensors are the language of general relativity, Schild wrote Tensor Calculus with John L. Synge as a textbook. According to a reviewer, "The ideas and concepts are given very concisely and thus a wide range of subjects is considered."

In 1957 Schild moved to the University of Texas at Austin. In 1962 he became Ashbel Smith Professor and founded the Center for Relativity at University of Texas, Austin. Engelbert Schücking described the recruitment of professors for the Center:

In 1962 Alfred got me an associate professorship in the Austin mathematics department, and in the summer of 1962, while attending Andrzej Trautman’s Relativity conference in Warsaw, Poland, … we persuaded Roger Penrose, Roy Kerr, Ray Sachs, Jürgen Ehlers, Luis Bel and others to flock to the newly created center of gravity in Austin.

In 1965, Schild found the Kerr–Schild form of the spacetime metric.

A dramatization of the calculation of the Kerr metric by Roy Kerr was written in 2009 by Fulvio Melia. Kerr had invited Schild to his office to calculate angular momentum in a solution to Einstein's field equations. "Alfred was a kind and cheerful man, with a flock of silvery hair." The climax of Cracking the Einstein Code was expressed as follows:

While Schild waited patiently in the armchair, Kerr began calculating at his desk...Kerr put down his pencil and looked up...Schild jumped out of his chair beaming. He appeared to be far more excited than Kerr himself and clearly knew what this meant.

In a 1970 seminar at Princeton University, Schild introduced an important mathematical construction now known as Schild's Ladder, which is used in differential geometry.

Schild clarified and enlarged general relativity through his studies of single-particle motion, quantization, special solutions and the conformal structure of space-time. ... His expositions of tensor analysis and relativity are still among the best and clearest treatments of these subjects.

Schild died on May 24, 1977, in Downer's Grove, Illinois, of a heart attack.

== Legacy ==
Schild's private papers are archived by the University of Texas.

== In popular culture ==
The science fiction novel Schild's Ladder by Greg Egan drew heavily on concepts introduced or refined by Schild.
