= Hong-Yee Chiu =

Taiwanese astrophysicist (b. 1932)

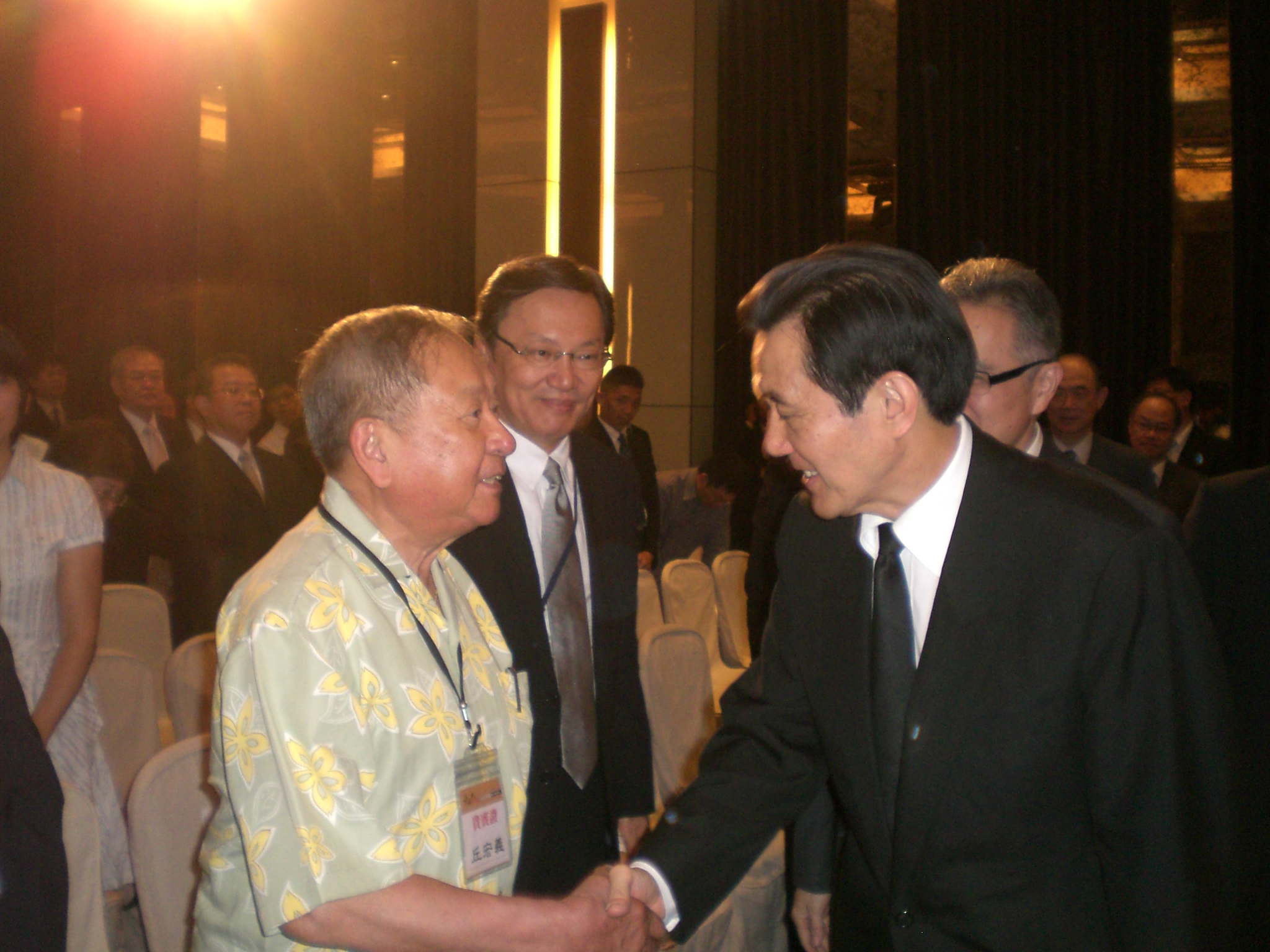
- Chiu and Ma Ying-jeou, President of Republic of China (Taiwan)
- Born: November 1, 1932 (age 93); Shanghai, Republic of China
- Education: National Taiwan University (BS); Oklahoma State University (BS); Cornell University (PhD)
- Awards: NASA Exceptional Scientific Achievement Medal (1969)

Hong-Yee Chiu
- Traditional Chinese: 丘宏義
- Simplified Chinese: 丘宏义
Transcriptions
Standard Mandarin
- Hanyu Pinyin: Qiū Hóngyì
- Wade–Giles: Ch'iu^{1} Hung^{2}-i^{4}
- IPA: [tɕʰjóʊ xʊ̌ŋ.î]

Hong-Yee Chiu (Chinese: 丘宏義; pinyin: Qiū Hóngyì; born November 1, 1932) is a Taiwanese astrophysicist. He worked under NASA for 35 years and was the publisher of the EHGBooks micro-publishing company.

== Early life and education ==
Chiu was born in Shanghai, China, on November 1, 1932, and was raised there until he was ten years old. As a teenager, he lived in Yong'an, Fuzhou, and Taipei before moving to Hong Kong, where he graduated from Chung Cheng High School in 1951. After high school, he earned a B.S. from National Taiwan University in 1954, then studied for four months at the Republic of China Military Academy.

In September 1955, Chiu moved to the U.S. to attend Oklahoma State University, where he graduated with a B.S. in 1956. He then earned his Ph.D. in astrophysics from Cornell University in 1959 under Philip Morrison. His dissertation at Cornell was titled, "Selected topics in particle physics".

== Career ==
After receiving his doctorate, he was a member at the Institute for Advanced Study in Princeton, New Jersey, until 1961. Chiu served as a Space Astrophysics Scientist for NASA for over 35 years. He was credited as the first scientist to introduce the term quasar for quasi-stellar radio sources (QSRS) in his Physics Today article in May 1964, and again in the proceedings of the First Texas Symposium on Relativistic Astrophysics, published in 1965. But the term was slow to catch on because the true nature of these objects remained poorly understood at the time. In 1969, Chiu became the first Chinese-American scientist to receive the NASA Exceptional Scientific Achievement Medal.

After his retirement from NASA, Chiu started the EHanism Group and developed an EHGBooks micropublishing app with some notable Chinese computer scientists in order to promote Chinese culture and Sinology memory. With his niece and assistant Nonny Hsueh, the family helped the National Central Library of Taiwan to participate in the World Digital Library organization under the auspices of UNESCO in 2008. Later on, Chiu led the EHanism Group to develop the first Amazon Micropublishing Chinese Solution in 2012. Chiu is the host of the 2013 Taiwan Reunion Program for NTU Early Graduates in commemoration of the 85th anniversary of National Taiwan University.

== Family ==
His father, Han-Ping Chiu, was an economist and lawyer in Shanghai during the Republican Era in China and the financial prime minister of Fukien Province, China. His late brother Hungdah Chiu was a scholar of international law.

== Research ==
- "Gravitational collapse" Physics Today 17, 5, 21 (1964)
- "A Tunable X-ray Interferometer and the Empirical Determination of Phase Diffracted X-rays"
- "Supernovae, Neutrinos, and Neutron Stars"
- "Neutrino Theory of Stellar Collapse in Type II Supernovae"

== Publications ==
- 2012: Literature and Science / EHGBooks, USA
- 2012: Bilingual Introduction to Chinese and Western Poetry / EHGBooks, USA
- 2011: The Real China: Meteoric Renaissance – Relations with the West / EHGBooks, USA
- 2011: War among Gods and Men / EHGBooks, USA
