= Ivor Robinson (physicist) =

Anglo-American physicist (1923–2016)

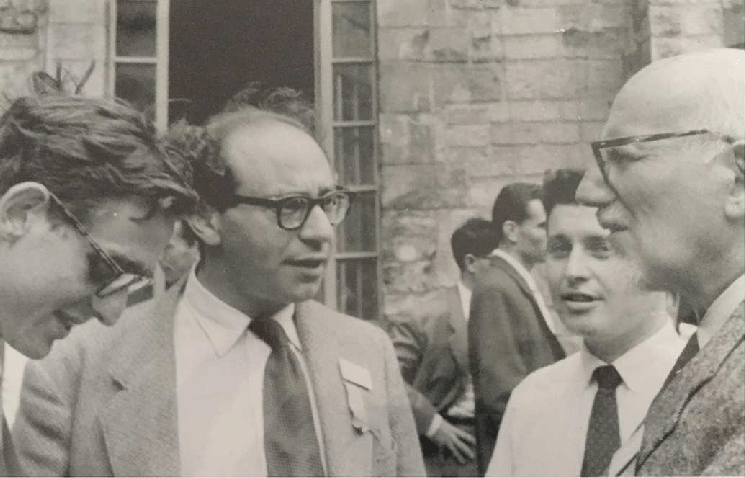
From left: Rainer Sachs, Ivor Robinson, Art Komar, John Lighton Synge, in 1962

Ivor Robinson (October 7, 1923 – May 27, 2016) was an Anglo-American mathematical physicist, noted for his contributions to the theory of relativity. He was a principal organizer of the Texas Symposium on Relativistic Astrophysics.

== Biography ==
Born "into a comfortable Jewish middle-class family" in Liverpool, October 7, 1923, Ivor Robinson read mathematics at Trinity College, Cambridge, as an undergraduate, where he was influenced by Abram Samoilovitch Besicovitch. He took his B.A. in Mathematics from the University of Cambridge in 1947. His first academic placements were at University College of Wales, King's College London, University of North Carolina, University of Hamburg, Syracuse University and Cornell University.

Alfred Schild was developing a department strong in relativity at Austin, Texas, when a second Texas center for relativity research was proposed. Lloyd Berkner was directing the Southwest Center for Advanced Studies at Dallas and brought Ivor Robinson there in 1963 when it was a "windowless cube on the Southern Methodist University campus". Robinson was head of the Mathematics and Mathematical Physics division. "Ivor was charged with the formation of a mathematical physics group concentrating on general relativity and cosmology." He brought Istvan Ozsváth and Wolfgang Rindler to the Dallas area as permanent members of the newly formed group, together with visitors and temporary appointments. This institution became the University of Texas at Dallas.

According to Rindler, "No one who knew him will forget what a brilliant conversationalist he was, with his sonorous deep voice and ultra-English accent, with his convictions and occasional mischievousness." "Ivor Robinson is a brilliant mathematician who showed us the elegant simplicity of space-time by pointing to its null structure."

Robinson retired in 2000, remaining Professor Emeritus in the Department of Mathematical Sciences at the University of Texas at Dallas.

== Scientific contributions ==
Ivor Robinson contributed extensively to modern developments in the theory of relativity. He is known for his work on null electromagnetic fields ("Robinson's theorem"), for his collaboration with Andrzej Trautman on models for spherical gravitational waves, and for the Bel–Robinson tensor. Roger Penrose has credited him as an important influence in the development of twistor theory, through his construction of the so-called Robinson congruences.
