= Kantowski–Sachs metric =

Metric of a homogenous universe

In general relativity the Kantowski-Sachs metric (named after Ronald Kantowski and Rainer K. Sachs) describes a homogeneous but anisotropic universe whose spatial section has the topology of $\mathbb{R} \times S^{2}$. The metric is:

$$ds^{2} = -dt^{2} + e^{2\sqrt{\Lambda}t} dz^{2} + \frac{1}{\Lambda}(d\theta^{2} + \sin^{2}\theta d\phi^{2})$$

The isometry group of this spacetime is $\mathbb{R} \times SO(3)$. Remarkably, the isometry group does not act simply transitively on spacetime, nor does it possess a subgroup with simple transitive action.

== See also ==
- Bianchi classification
- Dust solution
