= Tom Wasow =

American linguist

Thomas A. Wasow is Professor of Linguistics, emeritus, and the Clarence Irving Lewis Professor of Philosophy, emeritus at Stanford University.

Wasow did his undergraduate studies in mathematics at Reed College, graduating in 1967. He earned his Ph.D. in linguistics from the Massachusetts Institute of Technology in 1972, and joined the Stanford faculty in 1973. At Stanford, he was a co-founder of the Center for the Study of Language and Information and directed it from 1986 to 1987 and 2006 to 2007. He served a four-year term as Dean of Undergraduate Studies at Stanford beginning in 1987, another four-year term as Associate Dean of Graduate Policy beginning in 1996, was chair of the faculty senate for the 2003-4 academic year, chaired the linguistics department from 2007 to 2010 and 2011 to 2014, and served as Academic Secretary to the University from 2017 to 2024. He has won Stanford's Rhodes Prize and Dinkelspiel Prize for his leadership of the Symbolic Systems program, an interdisciplinary undergraduate major he directed for thirteen years. He was appointed to the Lewis professorship in 2008. In 2015 he was named a Fellow of the Linguistic Society of America and in 2019 he was named a Fellow of the American Association for the Advancement of Science.

He is also an avid bicyclist, and has been active combating homelessness and developing low-income housing in the Palo Alto area.

Tom Wasow's father was the mathematician Wolfgang R. Wasow.

== Bibliography ==
- Wasow, Thomas (1979), Anaphora in generative grammar, SIGLA, 2, Ghent, ISBN 978-90-6439-162-0
- Wasow, Thomas; Center for the Study of Language and Information (U.S.) (2002), Postverbal behavior, CSLI lecture notes, no. 145, CSLI, ISBN 978-1-57586-401-3
- Sag, Ivan A; Wasow, Thomas; Bender, Emily (2003), Syntactic theory : a formal introduction, CSLI lecture notes, no. 152, Center for the Study of Language and Information, ISBN 9781575864006
