= Aleksei Zinovyevich Petrov =

Soviet mathematician (1910–1972)

Aleksei Zinovyevich Petrov (Russian: Алексе́й Зино́вьевич Петро́в; 28 October (15 October, Old Style) 1910, Koshki, Samara Governorate, Russian Empire – 9 May 1972, Kiev, Soviet Union) was a mathematician noted for his work on the classification of Einstein spaces, today called Petrov classification.

The Petrov classification is related with the Weyl tensor and it was first published by A. Z. Petrov in 1954.
