= Valentine Joseph =

Sri Lankan Tamil mathematician

Professor Valentine Joseph
- வலன்டைன் யோசப்
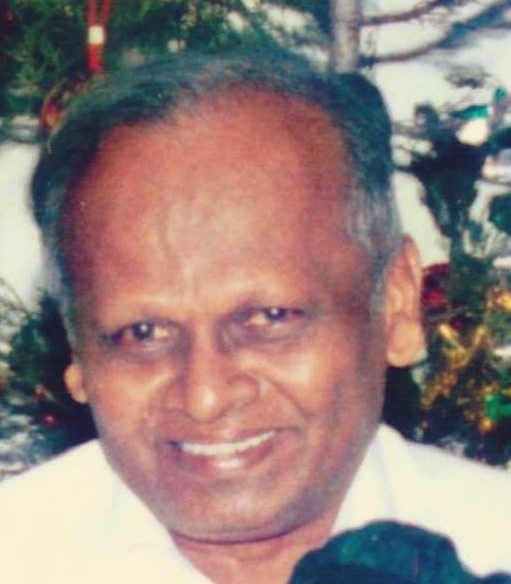
- Joseph in December 1994
- Born: 27 January 1929; Penang, Malaya
- Died: 15 March 2017 (aged 88); Colombo, Sri Lanka
- Occupation: Academic
- Spouse: Antonia Arulanandam
- Children: Arulesh, Umesh

Academic background
- Education: King's College London; University of Ceylon (Colombo campus)
- Thesis: Mechanics and Optics in General Relativity (1967)
- Doctoral advisor: Felix Pirani
- Influences: Albert Einstein

Academic work
- Discipline: Applied mathematics
- Sub-discipline: Theoretical physics
- Main interests: General relativity

Valentine Joseph (27 January 1929 – 15 March 2017) was a Sri Lankan Tamil mathematician, noted for his contributions to education.

== Early life and education ==
Joseph was born in Penang, Malaya to Sri Lankan Tamil parents. His extended family were Roman Catholics, with his cousin, Dominic Vendargon, becoming the first Archbishop of Kuala Lumpur. Joseph commenced school at St. Xavier's Institution in Penang in 1935.

Joseph prepared for the University Entrance Examination as a science student studying pure mathematics, applied mathematics, physics and geography at St. Patrick's College, Jaffna. In 1949, Joseph entered University of Ceylon (Colombo campus) to study for a four-year mathematics degree, obtaining a first class degree in three years.

== Career ==
Joseph joined the University of Ceylon (Colombo campus) as an assistant lecturer in 1952 where he stayed for the next 42 years. As one of the prominent mathematicians in Sri Lanka at the time, he represented the country at many international gatherings and organisations such as the International Centre for Theoretical Physics in Trieste, Italy. He was sent by the university to King's College London in 1956 to commence a doctoral thesis in mathematical physics, joining a renowned group of General Relativity specialists, under the guidance of Professor Felix Pirani, to work on developing Einstein's Theory of General Relativity. Joseph went on to publish a number of academic papers pertaining to this subject.

His output of articles and lectures covering these themes, spanned a period of over 60 years, from 1955 to 2016.

During his university career, which spanned over four decades, Joseph taught several generations of students, first as a lecturer and later as a professor. In addition to his university duties, Joseph was Chief Examiner for the GCE Advanced level examinations in mathematics for over twenty years, setting exam questions which were regarded to have been creative. He also authored an A-level mathematics textbook in Sinhala entitled Gathikaya in 1994. He maintained an interest in teaching throughout his later retirement, and in 2016 published an updated English edition of his book, Dynamics: Newtonian Relativity.

Joseph gave his final lecture in 2016 entitled "Einstein: The Wunderkind".

== Personal life ==
Joseph married Antonia (née Arulanandam) in 1965 and they had two children, Umesh and Arulesh.

Joseph and his family were badly affected during the ethnic riots of 1983. According to witnesses, before a mob ransacked his house in Colombo, Joseph was asked whether he was a Tamil or a Sinhalese. He replied in Sinhala: "I am a human being". Following this statement, he was physically assaulted.

== Academic papers on relativity ==
- Valentine Joseph (1957) Physical Properties of Some Empty Space-Times. Proceedings of the Cambridge Philosophical Society, Volume 53, Part 4, pp. 836–842
- Valentine Joseph (1958) On Apparent Luminosity In General Relativity. Monthly Notices of the Royal Astronomical Society, Volume 118, No. 6, pp. 631–639.
- Valentine Joseph (1966) A spatially homogeneous gravitational field. Proceedings of the Cambridge Philosophical Society, Volume 62, pp. 87–89
- D. Lorenz-Petzold, V. Joseph (1985) Comment on the Bianchi Type-V Vacuum Model. General Relativity and Gravitation, Volume 17, No. 5.
