= Kurt Otto Friedrichs =

German-American mathematician (1901–1982)

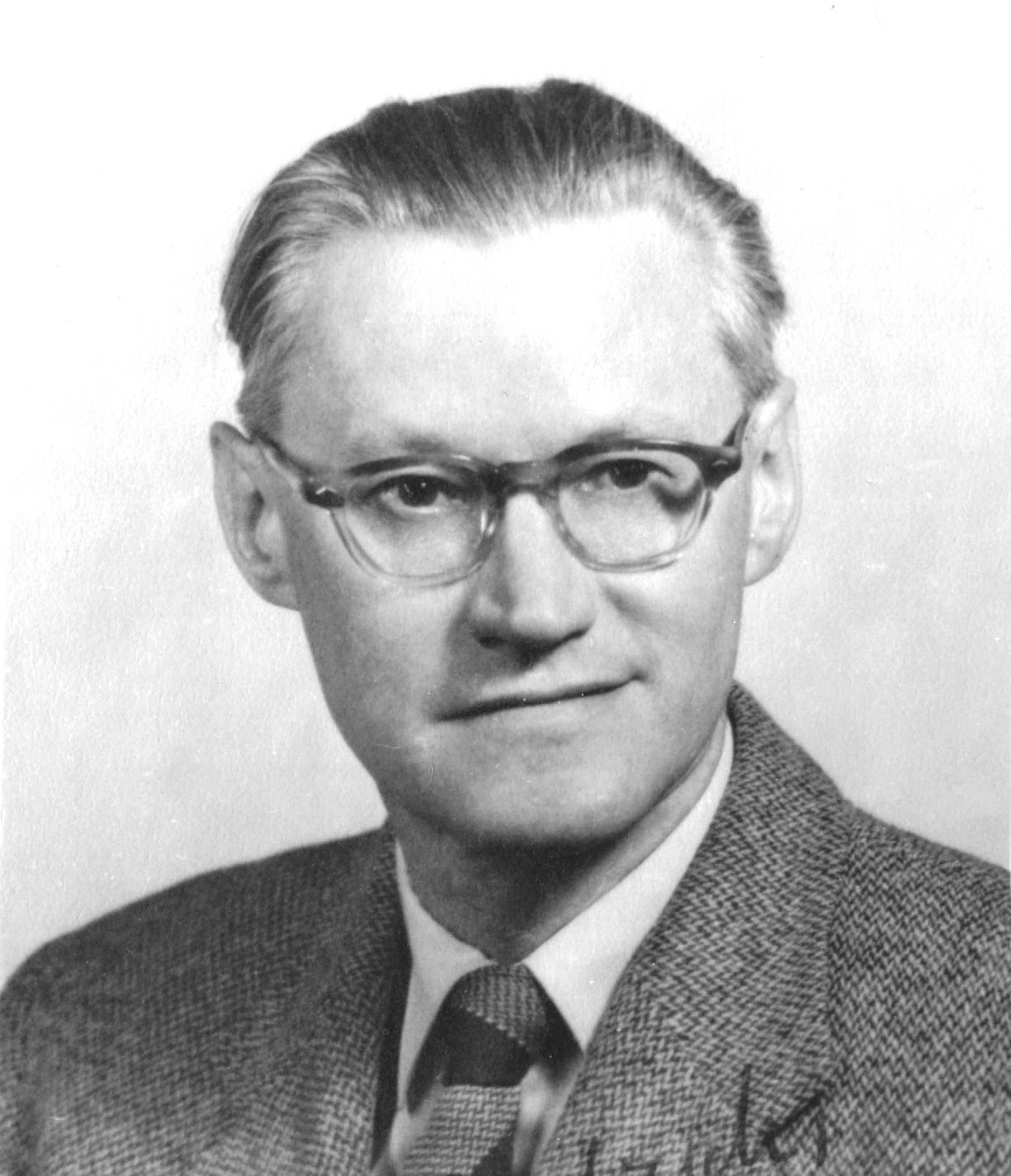
- Born: September 28, 1901; Kiel, Province of Schleswig-Holstein, German Empire
- Died: December 31, 1982 (aged 81); New Rochelle, New York, U.S.
- Education: Georg-August-Universität Göttingen
- Known for: Friedrichs extension Friedrichs mollifiers Friedrichs' inequality CFL Condition; Lax–Friedrichs method Newton-Cartan theory
- Awards: John von Neumann Prize (1979); National Medal of Science (1976); Gibbs Lecture (1954)
- Scientific career
- Fields: Applied mathematics
- Workplaces: Technische Universität Braunschweig, Courant Institute
- Doctoral advisor: Richard Courant
- Doctoral students: Raphael Høegh-Krohn; Eugene Isaacson; Peter Lax; Cathleen Synge Morawetz; Leonard Sarason; Wolfgang R. Wasow; Chia-Kun Chu; Jerome Berkowitz; Daniel Slotnick

Kurt Otto Friedrichs (September 28, 1901 – December 31, 1982) was a German-American mathematician. He was the co-founder of the Courant Institute at New York University, and a recipient of the National Medal of Science.

== Biography ==
Friedrichs was born in Kiel, Schleswig-Holstein on September 28, 1901. His family soon moved to Düsseldorf, where he grew up. He attended several different universities in Germany studying the philosophical works of Heidegger and Husserl, but finally decided that mathematics was his real calling. During the 1920s, Friedrichs pursued this field in Göttingen, which had a renowned Mathematical Institute under the direction of Richard Courant. Courant became a close colleague and lifelong friend of Friedrichs.

In 1931, Friedrichs became a full professor of mathematics at the Technische Hochschule in Braunschweig. In early February 1933, a few days after Hitler became the Chancellor of Germany, Friedrichs met and immediately fell in love with a young Jewish student, Nellie Bruell. Their relationship became increasingly challenging and difficult because of the antisemitic Nuremberg Laws of Hitler's government. In 1937, both Friedrichs and Nellie Bruell managed to emigrate separately to New York City where they finally married. Their long and very happy marriage produced five children.

Courant had left Germany in 1933 and had founded an institute for graduate studies in mathematics at New York University. Friedrichs joined him when he arrived in 1937 and remained there for forty years. He was instrumental in the development of the Courant Institute of Mathematical Sciences, which eventually became one of the most distinguished research institutes for applied mathematics in the world. Friedrichs died in New Rochelle, New York on December 31, 1982.

Friedrichs' greatest contribution to applied mathematics was his work on partial differential equations. He also did major research and wrote many books and papers on existence theory, numerical methods, differential operators in Hilbert space, non-linear buckling of plates, flows past wings, solitary waves, shock waves, combustion, magneto-fluid dynamical shock waves, relativistic flows, quantum field theory, perturbation of the continuous spectrum, scattering theory, and symmetric hyperbolic equations. With Cartan, Friedrichs gave a "geometrized" formulation of Newtonian gravitation theory—also known as "Newton–Cartan theory"—and later developed by Dautcourt, Dixon, Dombrowski and Horneffer, Ehlers, Havas, Künzle, Lottermoser, Trautman, and others.

A member of the National Academy of Sciences since 1959, Friedrichs received many honorary degrees and awards for his work. There is a student prize named after Friedrichs at NYU. The American Mathematical Society selected him as the Josiah Willards Gibbs lecturer for 1954. In November 1977, Friedrichs received the National Medal of Science from President Jimmy Carter "for bringing the powers of modern mathematics to bear on problems in physics, fluid dynamics, and elasticity."

== Selected bibliography ==
- Courant, R.; Friedrichs, K. O. (1948), Supersonic Flow and Shock Waves, New York: Interscience
- R. von Mises and K. O. Friedrichs, Fluid Dynamics, Springer-Verlag (1971).
- K. O. Friedrichs, Perturbation of Spectra in Hilbert Space, American Mathematical Society (1965).
- K. O. Friedrichs, Mathematical aspects of the quantum theory of fields, Interscience (1953).
- K. O. Friedrichs, Spectral Theory of Operators in Hilbert Space, Springer-Verlag (1981).
- Friedrichs, Kurt Otto (1986), Morawetz, Cathleen S. (ed.), Selecta, Contemporary Mathematicians, Boston–Basel–Stuttgart: Birkhäuser Verlag, ISBN 0-8176-3270-0. A selection from Friedrichs' works with a biography and commentaries of David Isaacson, Fritz John, Tosio Kato, Peter Lax, Louis Nirenberg, Wolfgang Wasow, Harold Weitzner.

== See also ==
- Singular perturbation
