= Rainer K. Sachs =

German-American mathematical physicist (1932–2024)

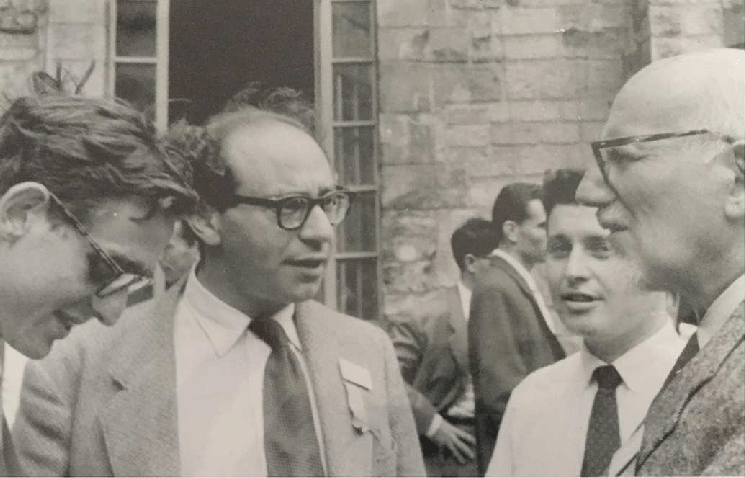
From left: Rainer Sachs, Ivor Robinson, Art Komar, John Lighton Synge, in 1962

Rainer Kurt "Ray" Sachs (June 13, 1932 – April 16, 2024) was a German-American mathematical physicist, with interests in general relativistic cosmology and astrophysics, as well as a computational radiation biologist. He was professor emeritus of Mathematics and Physics at the University of California, Berkeley, and adjunct professor at Tufts Medical School.

== Early life ==
Sachs was born in Frankfurt am Main on June 13, 1932, a son of the German Jewish metallurgist George Sachs. In 1937 the family left Germany to flee from Nazi persecution, and settled in the United States, so Rainer Sachs is generally considered an American scientist. In 1949, he graduated from University School, in Cleveland, Ohio.

He received his bachelor's degree in mathematics from MIT in 1953 and his PhD in theoretical physics from Syracuse University in 1959.

== Career ==
In 1962, Joshua N. Goldberg and Sachs proved the Goldberg–Sachs theorem. Later that year, he gave the first exposition of the asymptotically flat spacetime symmetry group, which he called the "generalized Bondi-Metzner group" and is now known as the Bondi–Metzner–Sachs group.

In 1966, he and Ronald Kantowski were responsible for the Kantowski–Sachs dust solutions to the Einstein field equation. These are a widely used family of anisotropic cosmological models.

In 1967, he and Arthur M. Wolfe were the authors of the Sachs–Wolfe effect, which concerns a property of the cosmic microwave background radiation. The Ehlers–Geren–Sachs theorem, published in 1968 by Jürgen Ehlers, P. Geren and R. Sachs, shows that if, in a given universe, there exists a reference frame at each event such that the cosmic background radiation is isotropic, then under certain conditions that universe is an isotropic and homogeneous FLRW spacetime.

From 1969 to 1993, he was a Professor of Mathematics and Physics at the University of California, Berkeley (UCB), and from 1993 he was Professor Emeritus at UCB. In 1994, he was appointed Research Professor of Mathematics UCB, and since 2005 he has been an adjunct professor at the Tufts medical school.

Until 1985, he worked on general relativistic cosmology and astrophysics. With Hung-Hsi Wu, he co-wrote the books General Relativity and Cosmology in 1971 and General Relativity for Mathematicians in 1977. From 1985, he has worked in mathematical and computational biology, especially radiation biology. His work in radiobiology has included research on radiation and cancer.

== Later life ==
Sachs died on April 16, 2024, at the age of 91 in Berkeley, California.
