= Dust solution =

Class of exact solutions to Einstein's field equations

In general relativity, a dust solution is a fluid solution, a type of exact solution of the Einstein field equation, in which the gravitational field is produced entirely by the mass, momentum, and stress density of a perfect fluid that has positive mass density but vanishing pressure. Dust solutions are an important special case of fluid solutions in general relativity.

== Dust model ==
A perfect and pressureless fluid can be interpreted as a model of a configuration of dust particles that locally move in concert and interact with each other only gravitationally, from which the name is derived. For this reason, dust models are often employed in cosmology as models of a toy universe, in which the dust particles are considered as highly idealized models of galaxies, clusters, or superclusters. In astrophysics, dust models have been employed as models of gravitational collapse. Dust solutions can also be used to model finite rotating disks of dust grains; some examples are listed below. If superimposed somehow on a stellar model comprising a ball of fluid surrounded by vacuum, a dust solution could be used to model an accretion disk around a massive object; however, no such exact solutions that model rotating accretion disks are yet known due to the extreme mathematical difficulty of constructing them.

== Mathematical definition ==
The stress–energy tensor of a relativistic pressureless fluid can be written in the simple form

$$T^{\mu\nu} = \rho_0 U^\mu U^\nu.$$

Here, the world lines of the dust particles are the integral curves of their four-velocity $U^\mu$ and the matter density in dust's rest frame is given by the scalar function $\rho_0$.

== Eigenvalues ==
Because the stress-energy tensor is a rank-one matrix, a short computation shows that the characteristic polynomial

$$\chi(\lambda) = \lambda^4 + a_3 \, \lambda^3 + a_2 \, \lambda^2 + a_1 \, \lambda + a_0$$

of the Einstein tensor in a dust solution will have the form

$$\chi(\lambda) = \left( \lambda - 8 \pi \mu \right) \, \lambda^3 .$$

Multiplying out this product, we find that the coefficients must satisfy the following three algebraically independent (and invariant) conditions:

$$a_0 \, = a_1 = a_2 = 0 .$$

Using Newton's identities, in terms of the sums of the powers of the roots (eigenvalues), which are also the traces of the powers of the Einstein tensor itself, these conditions become:

$$t_2 = {t_1}^2, \; \; t_3 = {t_1}^3, \; \; t_4 = {t_1}^4$$

In tensor index notation, this can be written using the Ricci scalar as:

$${G^a}_a = -R$$
$${G^a}_b \, {G^b}_a = R^2$$
$${G^a}_b \, {G^b}_c \, {G^c}_a = -R^3$$
$${G^a}_b \, {G^b}_c \, {G^c}_d \, {G^d}_a = R^4$$

This eigenvalue criterion is sometimes useful in searching for dust solutions, since it shows that very few Lorentzian manifolds could possibly admit an interpretation, in general relativity, as a dust solution.

== Examples ==
=== Null dust solution ===
A null dust solution is a dust solution where the Einstein tensor is null.

=== Bianchi dust ===
A Bianchi dust model exhibits various types of Lie algebras of Killing vector fields.

Special cases include FLRW and Kasner dust.

==== Kasner dust ====
A Kasner dust is the simplest cosmological model exhibiting anisotropic expansion.

==== FLRW dust ====
Friedmann–Lemaître–Robertson–Walker (FLRW) dusts are homogeneous and isotropic. These solutions often referred to as the matter-dominated FLRW models.

=== Rotating dust ===
The van Stockum dust is a cylindrically symmetric rotating dust.

The Neugebauer–Meinel dust models a rotating disk of dust matched to an axisymmetric vacuum exterior. This solution has been called, the most remarkable exact solution discovered since the Kerr vacuum.

=== Other solutions ===
Noteworthy individual dust solutions include:

- Lemaître–Tolman–Bondi (LTB) dusts (some of the simplest inhomogeneous cosmological models, often employed as models of gravitational collapse)
- Kantowski–Sachs dusts (cosmological models which exhibit perturbations from FLRW models)
- Gödel metric

== See also ==
- Lorentz group
