= Roy Kerr =

New Zealand mathematician

Roy P. Kerr CNZM FRS FRSNZ
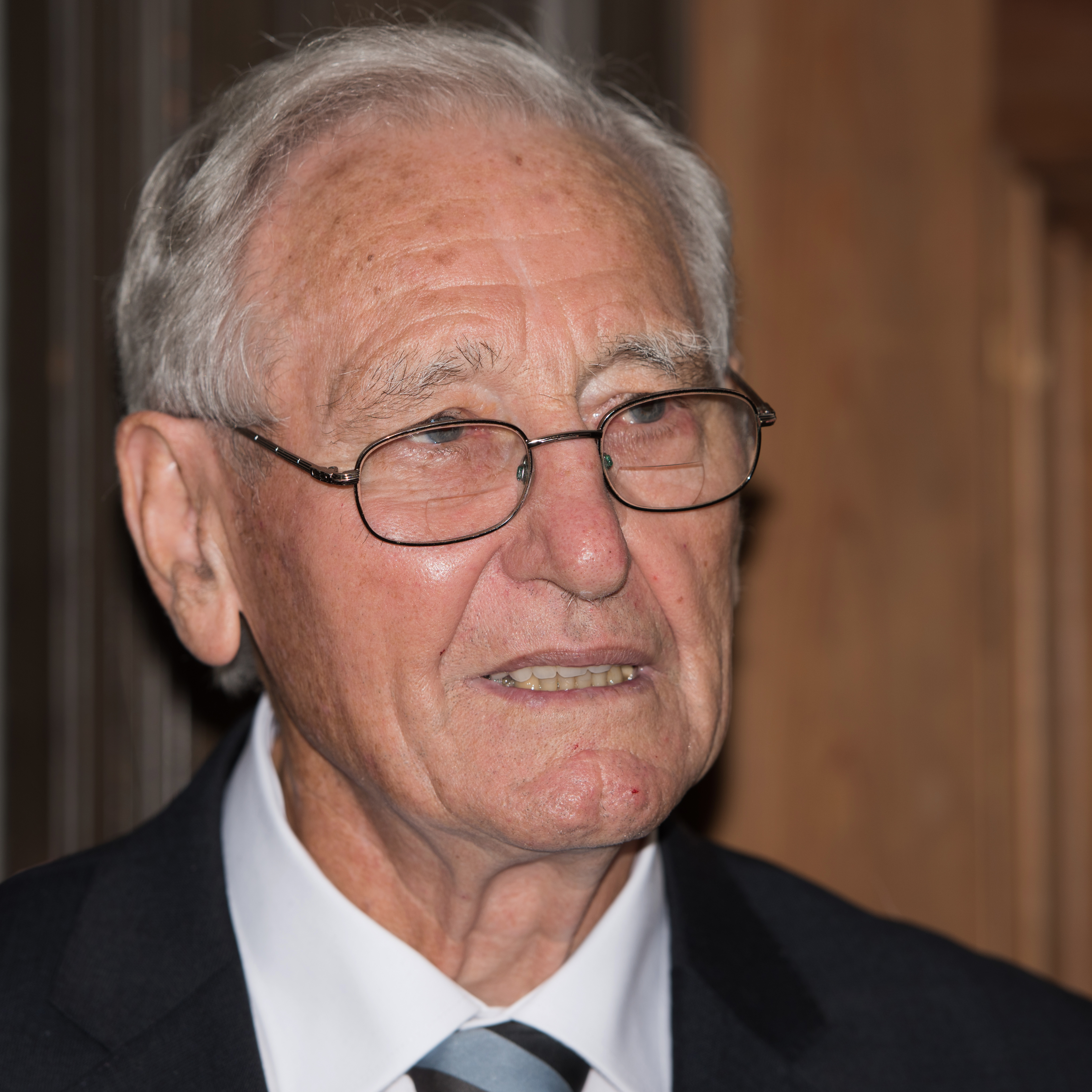
- Kerr in 2016
- Born: 16 May 1934 (age 92); Kurow, New Zealand
- Education: St. Andrew's College, Christchurch
- Alma mater: University of New Zealand (BSc); University of Cambridge (PhD)
- Known for: Kerr metric Kerr–Newman metric Kerr–Schild perturbations
- Awards: Hector Medal (1982); Hughes Medal (1984); Rutherford Medal (1993); Albert Einstein Medal (2013); Crafoord Prize (2016); Oskar Klein Medal (2020); Dirac Medal (ICTP) (2025)
- Scientific career
- Fields: Mathematics
- Workplaces: University of Canterbury; Syracuse University
- Thesis: Equations of Motion in General Relativity (1960)

Roy Patrick Kerr CNZM FRS FRSNZ (/kɜːr/; born 16 May 1934) is a New Zealand mathematician who discovered the Kerr geometry, an exact solution to the Einstein field equation of general relativity. His solution models the gravitational field outside an uncharged rotating massive object, including a rotating black hole. His solution to Einstein's equations predicted spinning black holes before they were discovered.

== Early life and education ==
Kerr was born in 1934 in Kurow, New Zealand. He was born into a dysfunctional family, and his mother was forced to leave when he was three. When his father went to war, he was sent to a farm. After his father's return from war, they moved to Christchurch. He was accepted to St Andrew's College, a private school, as his father had served under a former headmaster. Kerr's mathematical talent was first recognised while he was still a student at St Andrew's College. Although there was no mathematics teacher there at the time, he was able in 1951 to go straight into the third year of mathematics at Canterbury University College, a constituent of the University of New Zealand and the precursor to the University of Canterbury. Their regulations did not permit him to graduate until 1954 and so it was not until September 1955 that he moved to the University of Cambridge, where he earned his PhD in 1959. His dissertation concerned the equations of motion in general relativity.

== Career and research ==
After a postdoctoral fellowship at Syracuse University, where Einstein's collaborator Peter Bergmann was a professor, he spent some time working for the United States Air Force at Wright-Patterson Air Force Base. Kerr speculated that the "main reason why the US Air Force had created a General Relativity section was probably to show the U.S. Navy that they could also do pure research."

=== Work at Texas and Canterbury ===
In 1962, Kerr joined Alfred Schild and his Relativity Group at the University of Texas at Austin. As Kerr wrote in 2009:

By the summer of 1963, Maarten Schmidt at Caltech had shown that certain starlike objects (now called quasars) were actually distant objects emitting enormous amounts of energy. Nobody understood how they could be so bright. In an effort to unravel this mystery, several hundred astronomers, astrophysicists, and general relativists gathered for a conference in Dallas, held in early December that year. This would be the First (of what since then has become the biennial) Texas Symposium on Relativistic Astrophysics.

Kerr presented to the Symposium his solution to the Einstein field equations. Subrahmanyan Chandrasekhar (Nobel laureate, 1983) is quoted as having said :

"In my entire scientific life, extending over forty-five years, the most shattering experience has been the realization that an exact solution of Einstein's equations of general relativity, discovered by the New Zealand mathematician, Roy Kerr, provides the absolutely exact representation of untold numbers of massive black holes that populate the universe"

In 1965, with Alfred Schild, he introduced the concept of Kerr–Schild perturbations and developed the Kerr–Newman metric. During his time in Texas, Kerr supervised four PhD students.

In 1971, Kerr returned to the University of Canterbury in New Zealand. Kerr retired from his position as Professor of Mathematics at the University of Canterbury in 1993 after having been there for twenty-two years, including ten years as the head of the Mathematics department.

=== Awards and honours ===
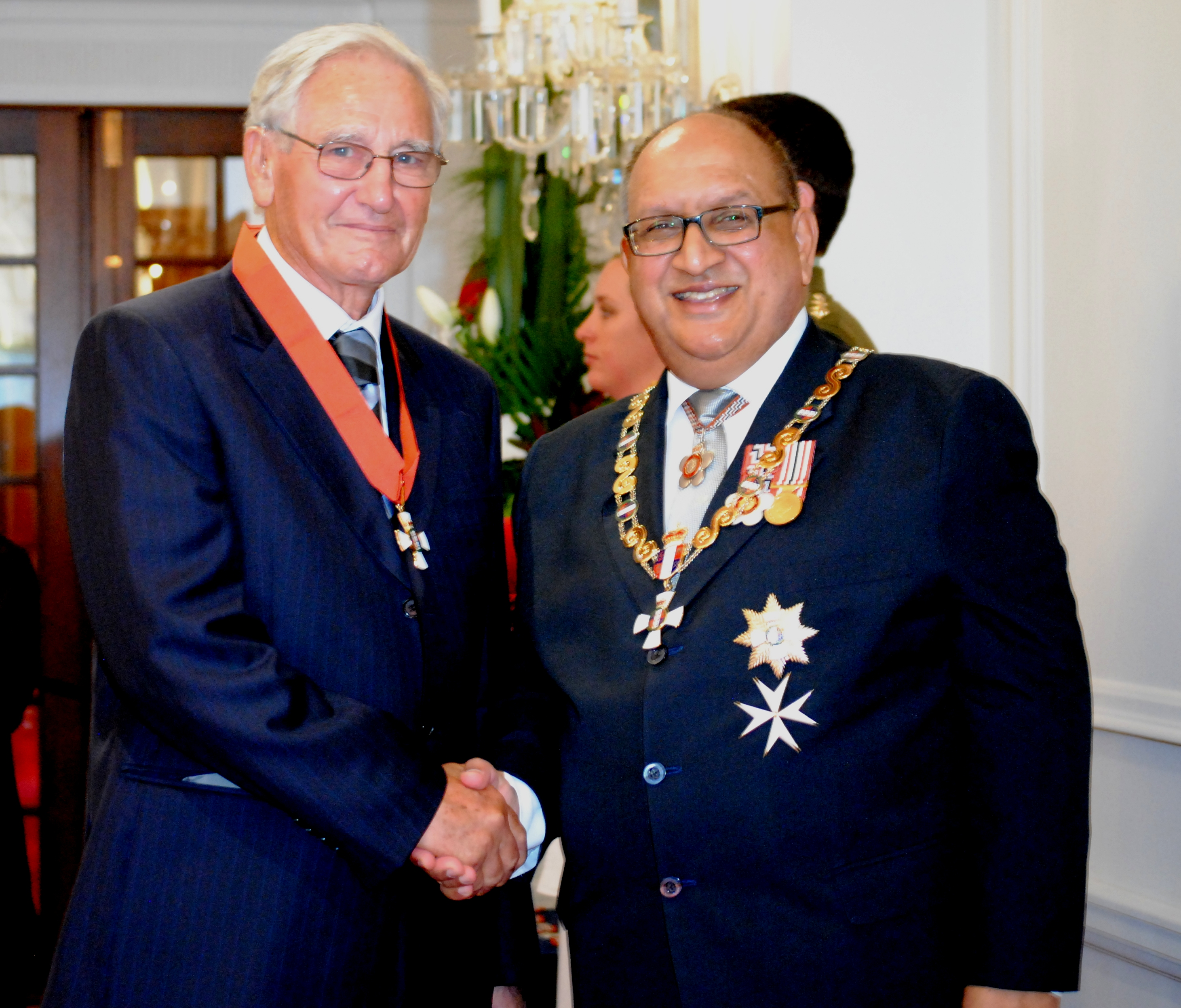
Kerr (left), after his investiture as a Companion of the New Zealand Order of Merit by the governor-general, Sir Anand Satyanand, at Government House, Wellington, on 14 April 2011

- Hector Medal (1982) "for his work in theoretical physics. ... an exact solution of Einstein's equations of general relativity, ..."
- Hughes Medal (1984) "for his distinguished work on relativity, especially for his discovery of the so-called Kerr Black Hole, which has been very influential."
- Rutherford Medal (1993) "For his outstanding discoveries in the extra-terrestrial world of black holes."
- Marcel Grossmann Award (2006) "for his fundamental contribution to Einstein's theory of general relativity: ..."
- Companion of the New Zealand Order of Merit for services to astrophysics (2011)
- Albert Einstein Medal (2013) "for his 1963 discovery of a solution to Einstein's gravitational field equations."
- Crafoord Prize in Astronomy (2016)
- Canterbury Distinguished Professor (2016)
- Oskar Klein Medal (2020)
- Laureate Distinguished Fellow of IETI (2024)

In 2008 Kerr was appointed to the Yevgeny Lifshitz ICRANet Chair in Pescara, Italy.

Fulvio Melia interviewed Kerr about his work on the solution for the book Cracking the Einstein Code: Relativity and the Birth of Black Hole Physics published in 2009. Kerr contributed an "Afterword" of two and a half pages.

In 2012, it was announced that Kerr would be honoured by the Albert Einstein Society in Switzerland with the 2013 Albert Einstein Medal. He is the first New Zealander to receive the prestigious award.

In December 2015, the University of Canterbury awarded Kerr an honorary Doctor of Science.

In 2025 he was awarded the Dirac Medal (ICTP).

== Personal life ==
Kerr is married to Margaret. In 2022, after 9 years in Tauranga they returned to Christchurch, where they now reside. Kerr was a notable bridge player representing New Zealand internationally in the mid-1970s. He was co-author of the Symmetric Relay System, a bidding system in contract bridge.
