= Mach effect =

The Mach effect can refer to:

- Mach bands are an optical illusion that are often referred as "the Mach effect".
- Mach's principle – a hypothesis attempting to explain a frame of reference for rotation
  - Mach effect or Mach effects (for spacecraft propulsion) – see Woodward effect
    - Mach-effect thruster – a hypothetical reactionless drive

== See also ==
- Sonic boom, an effect of traveling at Mach speeds in fluids
