= Helical =

Helical may refer to:

- Helix, the mathematical concept for the shape
- Helical engine, a proposed spacecraft propulsion drive
- Helical spring, a coilspring
- Helical plc, a British property company, once a maker of steel bar stock
- Helicoil, a mechanical thread repairing insert
- H-el-ical//, stage name for Hikaru, Japanese singer
