= EmDrive =

Device claimed to be a propellantless spacecraft thruster

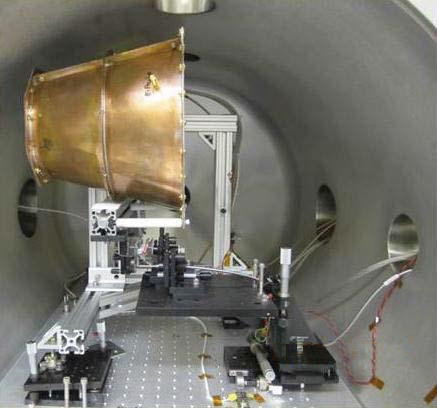
- EmDrive experiment, Eagleworks laboratory, 2013
- Country of origin: United States
- Date: 2001
- Status: Device concept

Performance
- Thrust, sea-level: 0 N (0 ozf)

The EmDrive is a controversial device first proposed in 2001, purported by its inventors to be a reactionless drive. While no mechanism for operation was proposed, claims about the EmDrive appear to violate the law of conservation of momentum and other laws of physics. The concept has at times been referred to as a resonant cavity thruster. Physicists and engineers generally regard the EmDrive concept as pseudoscience.

Neither person who claims to have invented the EmDrive committed to details about the device beyond showing prototypes they have built. While the lack of a published design or mechanism makes it hard to say whether a given object is an example of an EmDrive, over the years prototypes based on its public descriptions have been constructed and tested but results have been mixed to negative and often minor or attributed to errors.

In 2016, Harold White's group at NASA observed a small apparent thrust from one such test, however subsequent studies suggested this thrust was a measurement error caused by thermal gradients. In 2018 and 2021, Martin Tajmar's group at the Dresden University of Technology replicated and refuted White's results, observing apparent thrusts similar to those measured by his team, and then made them disappear again when measured using point suspension.

No other published experiment resulted in apparent thrust greater than the experiment's margin of error. Tajmar's group published three papers in 2021 claiming that all published results showing thrust had been false positives, explaining each by outside forces. They concluded, "Our measurements refute all EmDrive claims by at least 3 orders of magnitude."

== History and controversy ==
Rocket engines operate by expelling propellant, which acts as a reaction mass and which produces thrust per Newton's third law of motion. All designs for electromagnetic propulsion operate on the principle of reaction mass. A hypothetical drive which did not expel propellant in order to produce a reaction force, providing thrust while being a closed system with no external interaction, would be a reactionless drive, violating the conservation of momentum and Newton's third law. Reactionless drives, like other forms of perpetual motion, do not exist in nature, and physicists regard claims that a drive is reactionless as pseudoscience.

The first design of a resonant cavity thruster claiming to be a reactionless drive was by Roger Shawyer in 2001. He called his conical design an "EmDrive", and claimed that it produced thrust in the direction of the base of the cone. Guido Fetta later built a "Cannae Drive", based in part on Shawyer's concept, using a pillbox-shaped cavity.

Since 2008, a few physicists have tested their own models, trying to reproduce the results claimed by Shawyer and Fetta. Juan Yang at Xi'an's Northwestern Polytechnical University (NWPU) was unable to reproducibly measure thrust from their models, over the course of 4 years. In 2016, Harold White's group at NASA's Advanced Propulsion Physics Laboratory reported in the Journal of Propulsion and Power that a test of their own model had observed a small thrust. In late 2016, Yue Chen of the communication satellite division of the China Academy of Space Technology (CAST), said his team had tested prototypes, and would conduct in-orbit tests to determine if they could observe thrust. Martin Tajmar's group at the Dresden University of Technology started testing prototypes in 2015, and by 2021 concluded that observations of thrust were false positives, reporting in the CEAS Space Journal they had refuted all EmDrive claims by "at least 3 orders of magnitude".

=== Media coverage and responses ===
Media coverage of experiments using these designs has been polarized. The EmDrive first drew attention, both credulous and dismissive, when New Scientist wrote about it as an "impossible" drive in 2006. Media outlets were later criticized for misleading claims that a resonant cavity thruster had been "validated by NASA" following White's first tentative test reports in 2014. Scientists have continued to note the lack of unbiased coverage.

In 2006, responding to the New Scientist piece, mathematical physicist John C. Baez at the University of California, Riverside, and Australian science-fiction writer Greg Egan, said the positive results reported by Shawyer were likely misinterpretations of experimental errors.

In 2014, White's first conference paper suggested that resonant cavity thrusters could work by transferring momentum to the "quantum vacuum virtual plasma", a new term he coined. Baez and Carroll criticized this explanation, because in the standard description of vacuum fluctuations, virtual particles do not behave as a plasma; Carroll also noted that the quantum vacuum has no "rest frame", providing nothing to push against, so it cannot be used for propulsion. In the same way, physicists James F. Woodward and Heidi Fearn published two papers showing that electron−positron virtual pairs of the quantum vacuum, discussed by White as a potential virtual plasma propellant, could not account for thrust in any isolated, closed electromagnetic system such as a quantum vacuum thruster.

In 2015, physicists Eric W. Davis at the Institute for Advanced Studies in Austin and Sean M. Carroll at the California Institute of Technology concluded that the thrust measurements reported in papers by both Tajmar and White were indicative of thermal effect errors.

In May 2018, researchers from the Institute of Aerospace Engineering at Technische Universität Dresden, Germany, concluded that the dominant effect underlying the apparent thrust could be clearly identified as an artifact caused by Earth's magnetic field interacting with power cables in the chamber, a result that other experts agree with.

In March 2021, Tajmar's group published a definitive analysis of their own past experiments and those of others, showing that all could be explained by and reproduced via outside forces, refuting all EmDrive claims.

When power flows into the EmDrive, the engine warms up. This also causes the fastening elements on the scale to warp, causing the scale to move to a new zero point. We were able to prevent that in an improved structure. Our measurements refute all EmDrive claims by at least 3 orders of magnitude.

== Designs and prototypes ==
Simplified schematic of a prototype by Tajmar and Fiedler.

=== EmDrive ===
In 2001, Shawyer founded Satellite Propulsion Research Ltd, to work on the EmDrive, which he said used a resonant cavity to produce thrust without propellant. The company was backed by a SMART award grant from the UK Department of Trade and Industry. In December 2002, he loosely described a prototype which he alleged had produced a thrust of 0.02 newtons (0.072 ozf) powered by an 850 W cavity magnetron. He reported that the device could operate for only a few dozen seconds before the magnetron failed from overheating, however details were never published or replicated.

==== Second device and New Scientist article ====
In October 2006, Shawyer claimed to have conducted tests on a new water-cooled prototype with increased thrust. He reported plans to have the device ready to use in space by May 2009 and to make the resonant cavity a superconductor, neither of which materialized.

New Scientist magazine featured the EmDrive on the cover of 8 September 2006 issue. The article portrayed the device as plausible and emphasized the arguments of those who held that point of view. Egan, a popular science fiction author, distributed a public letter stating that "a sensationalist bent and a lack of basic knowledge by its writers" made the magazine's coverage unreliable, sufficient "to constitute a real threat to the public understanding of science". Especially, Egan said he was "gobsmacked by the level of scientific illiteracy" in the magazine's coverage, alleging that it used "meaningless double-talk" to obfuscate the problem of conservation of momentum. The letter was endorsed by Baez and posted on his blog. New Scientist editor Jeremy Webb responded to critics:

It is a fair criticism that New Scientist did not make clear enough how controversial Roger Shawyer's engine is. We should have made more explicit where it apparently contravenes the laws of nature and reported that several physicists declined to comment on the device because they thought it too contentious ... The great thing is that Shawyer's ideas are testable. If he succeeds in getting his machine flown in space, we will know soon enough if it is ground-breaking device or a mere flight of fancy.

New Scientist also published a letter from the former technical director of EADS Astrium:

I reviewed Roger's work and concluded that both theory and experiment were fatally flawed. Roger was advised that the company had no interest in the device, did not wish to seek patent coverage and in fact did not wish to be associated with it in any way.

A letter from physicist Paul Friedlander:

As I read it, I, like the thousands of other physicists who will have read it, immediately realised that this was impossible as described. Physicists are trained to use certain fundamental principles to analyse a problem and this claim clearly flouted one of them ... The Shawyer drive is as impossible as perpetual motion. Relativistic conservation of momentum has been understood for a century and dictates that if nothing emerges from Shawyer's device then its centre of mass will not accelerate. It is likely that Shawyer has used an approximation somewhere in his calculations that would have been reasonable if he hadn't then multiplied the result by 50,000. The reason physicists value principles such as conservation of momentum is that they act as a reality check against errors of this kind.

==== Later work ====
In 2007, the UK Department of Trade and Industry granted SPR an export license to Boeing in the US. According to Shawyer, in December 2008 he was invited to present on the EmDrive, and in 2009 Boeing expressed interest in it, at which point he stated that SPR built a thruster which produced 18 grams of thrust, and sent it to Boeing. Boeing did not license the technology and communication stopped. In 2012, a Boeing representative confirmed that Boeing Phantom Works used to explore exotic forms of space propulsion, including Shawyer's drive, but such work later ceased. They confirmed that "Phantom Works is not working with Mr. Shawyer", nor pursuing those explorations.

In 2014, Shawyer presented ideas for 'second-generation' EmDrive designs and applications at the annual International Astronautical Congress. A paper based on his presentation was published in Acta Astronautica in 2015. While no functional prototype of the first-generation drive had yet been produced, and no detailed schematic of a new device was provided, it loosely described models for a superconducting resonant cavity and for thrusters with multiple cavities.

In 2016, Shawyer filed further patents and launched a new company, Universal Propulsion Ltd., as a joint venture with Gilo Industries Group, a small UK aerospace company.

=== Cannae and other drives ===
The Cannae Drive (formerly Q-drive) is another implementation of this idea, with a relatively flat cavity. It was designed by Guido Fetta in 2006 and promoted within the US through his company, Cannae LLC, since 2011. In 2016, Fetta announced plans to eventually launch a CubeSat satellite containing a version of the Cannae Drive, which would run for 6 months to observe how it functions in space. No followup was published.

In China, researchers working under Yang at NWPU built a resonant cavity thruster in 2008, and tested it for a number of years. A 2012 report claimed they had observed thrust, but in 2014 they found it to have been an experimental error. A second, improved prototype did not produce any measured thrust.

At the China Academy of Space Technology, Yue Chen filed several patent applications in 2016 describing various radio frequency (RF) resonant cavity thruster designs. These included a method for stacking several short resonant cavities to improve thrust, and a design with a cavity that was a semicylinder instead of a frustum. That December, Chen announced that CAST would conduct tests on a resonant cavity thruster in orbit, without specifying what design was used. In an interview on CCTV in September 2017, Chen showed some testing of a flat cylindrical device, corresponding to the patent describing stacked short cavities with internal diaphragms.

== Theoretical inconsistencies ==
All proposed theories for how the EmDrive works violate the conservation of momentum, which states any interaction cannot have a net force (i.e., the net sum of all forces is zero); a consequence of the conservation of momentum is Newton's third law, where for every action there is an equal and opposite reaction. Also, because force × velocity = power, any such device would violate conservation of energy when moving at a high enough velocity. The conservation of momentum is a symmetry of nature.

An often-cited example of apparent nonconservation of momentum is the Casimir effect, in the standard case where two parallel plates are attracted to each other. However the plates move in opposite directions, so no net momentum is extracted from the vacuum and, moreover, energy must be put into the system to take the plates apart again.

Assuming homogeneous electric and magnetic fields, it is impossible for the EmDrive, or any other device, to extract a net momentum transfer from either a classical or quantum vacuum. Extraction of a net momentum "from nothing" has been postulated in an inhomogeneous vacuum, but this remains highly controversial as it will violate Lorentz invariance.

Both Harold White's and Mike McCulloch's theories of how the EmDrive could work rely on these asymmetric or dynamical Casimir effects. However, if these vacuum forces are present, they are expected to be exceptionally tiny based on our current understanding, too small to explain the level of observed thrust. In the event that observed thrust is not due to experimental error, a positive result could indicate new physics.

== Tests and experiments ==
=== Tests by inventors ===
In 2004, Shawyer claimed to have received seven independent positive reviews from experts at BAE Systems, EADS Astrium, Siemens and the IEE. The technical director of EADS Astrium (Shawyer's former employer) denied this in the strongest terms, stating:

I reviewed Roger's work and concluded that both theory and experiment were fatally flawed. Roger was advised that the company had no interest in the device, did not wish to seek patent coverage and in fact did not wish to be associated with it in any way.

In 2011, Fetta claimed to have tested a superconducting version of the Cannae drive, suspended inside a liquid-helium-filled dewar, with inconclusive results.

None of these results were published in the scientific literature, replicated by independent researchers, or replicated consistently by the inventors. In a few cases details were posted for a time on the inventors' websites, but no such documents remained online as of 2019.

In 2015, Shawyer published an article in Acta Astronautica, summarising seven existing tests on the EmDrive. Of these, four produced a measured force in the intended direction, three produced thrust in the opposite direction, and in one test thrust could be produced in either direction by varying the spring constants in the measuring apparatus.

=== Northwestern Polytechnical University ===
In 2008, a team of Chinese researchers led by Juan Yang (杨涓), professor of propulsion theory and engineering of aeronautics and astronautics at Northwestern Polytechnical University (NWPU) in Xi'an, China, said that they had developed a valid electro-magnetic theory behind a microwave resonant cavity thruster. A demonstration version of the drive was built and tested with different cavity shapes and at higher power levels in 2010. Using an aerospace engine test stand usually used to precisely test spacecraft engines like ion drives, they reported a maximum thrust of 720 mN at 2,500 W of input power. Yang noted that her results were tentative, and said she "[was] not able to discuss her work until more results are published".

In a 2014 follow-up experiment (published in 2016), Yang could not reproduce the 2010 observation and suggested it was due to experimental error. They had refined their experimental setup, using a three-wire torsion pendulum to measure thrust, and tested two different power setups. They concluded that they were unable to measure significant thrust; that "thrust" measured when using external power sources (as in their 2010 experiment) could be noise; and that it was important to use self-contained power systems for these experiments, and more sensitive pendulums with lower torsional stiffness.

=== NASA Eagleworks ===
Since 2011, White had a team at NASA known as the Advanced Propulsion Physics Laboratory, or Eagleworks Laboratories, devoted to studying exotic propulsion concepts. The group investigated ideas for a wide range of untested and fringe proposals, including Alcubierre drives, drives that interact with the quantum vacuum, and RF resonant cavity thrusters.

In 2014, the group began testing resonant cavity thrusters and in July, White reported tentative positive results for evaluating a tapered RF resonant cavity. Their first tests of this tapered cavity were conducted at very low power (2% of Shawyer's 2002 experiment). A net mean thrust over five runs was measured at 91.2 μN at 17 W of input power. The experiment was criticized for its low power, small data set, and for not having been conducted in vacuum, to eliminate thermal air currents.

The group announced a plan to upgrade their equipment to higher power levels, and to use a test framework subject to independent verification and validation at one or more major research centers. This did not happen.

They later conducted experiments in vacuum at 40-80W of input power, publishing the results in November 2016 in the Journal of Propulsion and Power, under the title "Measurement of Impulsive Thrust from a Closed Radio-Frequency Cavity in Vacuum". The study said their system was "consistently performing with a thrust-to-power ratio of 1.2±0.1mN/kW", but also enumerated many potential sources of error. This was the first such paper published in a peer-reviewed journal, however the experiment was again criticized for its small dataset and missing details about the experimental setup, which was again not independently validated.

=== Dresden University of Technology ===
In July 2015, an aerospace research group at the Dresden University of Technology (TUD) under Martin Tajmar reported results for an evaluation of an RF resonant tapered cavity similar to the EmDrive. Testing was performed first on a knife-edge beam balance able to detect force at the micronewton level, atop an antivibration granite table at ambient air pressure; then on a torsion pendulum with a force resolution of 0.1 mN, inside a vacuum chamber at ambient air pressure and in a hard vacuum at 400 μPa (4×10^{−6} mbar).

They used a conventional ISM band 2.45 GHz 700 W oven magnetron, and a small cavity with a low Q factor (20 in vacuum tests). They observed small positive thrusts in the positive direction and negative thrusts in the negative direction, of about 20 μN in a hard vacuum. However, when they rotated the cavity upwards as a "null" configuration, they observed an anomalous thrust of hundreds of micronewtons, much larger than the expected result of zero thrust. This indicated a strong source of noise which they could not identify. This led them to conclude that they could not confirm or refute claims about the device.

In 2018, they published results from an improved test rig, which showed that their measured thrust had been a result of experimental error from insufficiently shielded components interacting with the Earth's magnetic field. In new experiments, they measured thrust values consistent with previous experiments and again measured thrust perpendicular to the expected direction when the thruster was rotated by 90°. Moreover, they did not measure a reduction in thrust when an attenuator was used to reduce the power that actually entered the resonant cavity by a factor of 10,000, which they said "clearly indicates that the "thrust" is not coming from the EMDrive but from some electromagnetic interaction." They concluded that "magnetic interaction from not sufficiently shielded cables or thrusters are a major factor that needs to be taken into account for proper μN thrust measurements for these type of devices," and they planned on conducting future tests at higher power and at different frequencies, and with improved shielding and cavity geometry.

In 2021, they revisited these experiments again and ran more precise tests. They reported with high confidence that the forces previously measured could be completely explained by experimental error, and that there was no evidence for any measurable thrust once these errors were taken into account. They were able to run the experiment and show no thrust in any direction, and to reintroduce the previous sources of experimental error to replicate the earlier results. They also replicated White's setup, showing that thermal effects could replicate the apparent thrust his team had observed, and that this thrust went away when measured with a more precise suspension. They went on to publish two further papers, showing similar negative results for the laser-based LemDrive variant and Woodward's Mach-Effect thruster.

=== Abandoned plans for tests in space ===
Since 2016, a few groups have raise funds for planned tests of EM drives or similar devices in space. As of 2025, there is no independent confirmation that any such device has gone to space, as none of the groups have published updates or technical details about the tests.

In August 2016, Cannae announced plans to launch a thruster on a cubesat which they would run for 6 months to observe how it functions in space. As of 2025, no launch details had been announced.

In December 2016, Yue Chen told a reporter at China's Science and Technology Daily that his team would test an EmDrive in orbit. Chen claimed their prototype's thrust was at the "micronewton to millinewton level", which would have to be scaled up to at least 100–1000 millinewtons for a chance of conclusive experimental results. After 2017, no further updates were announced.

In 2023, a new company, IVO Limited, claimed to be developing a similar drive, which they would test in space later that year on a cubesat, but in the end did not do so.

== Experimental errors ==
The strongest early result, from Yang's group in China, was later reported to be caused by an experimental error. Tajmar published an explanation of how all reports of apparent thrust could have been caused entirely by failing to account for all sources of error or noise.

Experimental errors in the testing of the prototypes generally fall into four categories

- Measurement error and noise. Most theoretical scientists who have looked at the EmDrive believe this to be the likely case.
- Thermal effects.
- Electromagnetic effects, including interaction with ambient magnetic fields and Lorentz forces from power leads.

Other potential sources of error include confirmation bias and publication bias (discarding negative results).

=== Measurement errors ===
The simplest and most likely explanation is that any thrust detected is due to experimental error or noise. In all of the experiments set up, a very large amount of energy goes into generating a tiny amount of thrust. When attempting to measure a small signal superimposed on a large signal, the noise from the large signal can obscure the small signal and give incorrect results.

=== Shift in center of gravity due to thermal effects ===
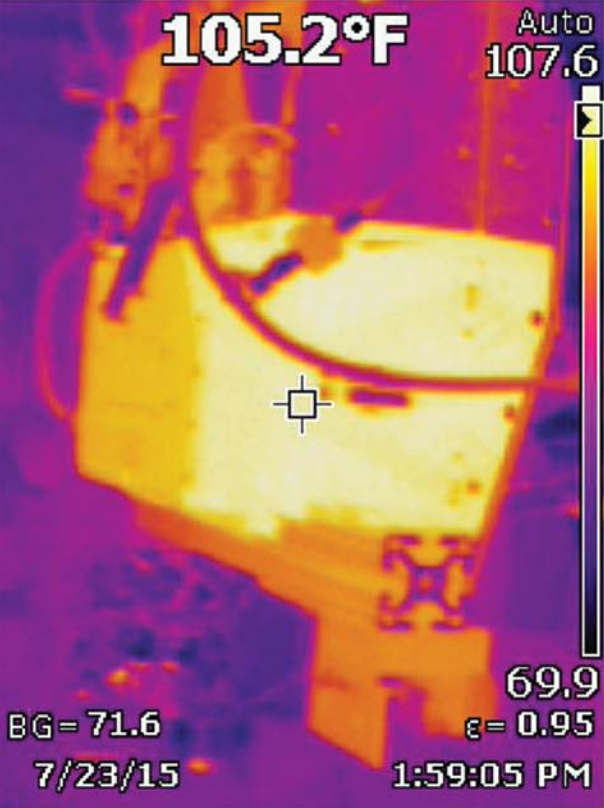
Infrared image showing heating of the heat sink

The largest error source is believed to come from the thermal expansion of the thruster's heat sink; as it expands this would lead to a change in the centre of gravity causing the resonant cavity to move. White's team attempted to model the thermal effect on the overall displacement by using a superposition of the displacements caused by "thermal effects" and "impulsive thrust" with White saying "That was the thing we worked the hardest to understand and put in a box". Despite these efforts, White's team were unable to fully account for the thermal expansion. In an interview with Aerospace America, White comments that "although maybe we put a little bit of a pencil mark through [thermal errors] ... they are certainly not black-Sharpie-crossed-out."

Their method of accounting for thermal effects has been criticized by Millis and Davies, who highlight that there is a lack of both mathematical and empirical detail to justify the assumptions made about those effects. For example, they do not provide data on temperature measurement over time compared to device displacement. The paper includes a graphical chart, but it is based on a priori assumptions about what the shapes of the "impulsive thrust" and "thermal effects" should be, and how those signals will superimpose. The model further assumes all noise to be thermal and does not include other effects such as interaction with the chamber wall, power lead forces, and tilting. Because the Eagleworks paper has no explicit model for thrust to compare with the observations, it is ultimately subjective, and its data can be interpreted in more than one way. The Eagleworks test, therefore, does not conclusively show a thrust effect, but cannot rule it out either.

White suggested future experiments could run on a Cavendish balance. In such a setup, the thruster could rotate out to much larger angular displacements, letting a thrust (if present) dominate any possible thermal effects. Testing a device in space would also eliminate the center-of-gravity issue. Tajmar's team later used such a setup to show that past results had all been artefacts of thermal effects.

=== Electromagnetic interactions ===
These experiments used relatively large electromagnetic inputs to generate small amounts of thrust. As a result, electromagnetic interactions between power leads, between power lines and ambient magnetic fields, or between the apparatus and walls of a test chamber, could all have significant effects.

Yang reported in 2016 that an interaction with the Earth's magnetic field had caused the fairly large apparent thrust in their 2012 paper. Tajmar looked for potential Lorentz force interactions between power leads in trying to replicate White's experimental setup. Another source of error could have arisen from electromagnetic interaction with the walls of the vacuum chamber. White argued that any wall interaction could only be the result of a well-formed resonance coupling between the device and wall and that the high frequency used imply the chances of this would be highly dependent on the device's geometry. As components get warmer due to thermal expansion, the device's geometry changes, shifting the resonance of the cavity. In order to counter this effect and keep the system in optimal resonance conditions, White used a phase-locked loop system (PLL). Their analysis assumed that using a PLL ruled out significant electromagnetic interaction with the wall.

== See also ==
- Abraham–Minkowski controversy
- Beam-powered propulsion § Direct impulse
- Casimir effect
- Crookes radiometer
- Dean drive
- Helical engine
- Quantum vacuum thruster
- Reactionless drive
- Unruh effect
- White–Juday interferometer experiment
- Woodward effect
