= IXS =

IXS may refer to:

- IXS, IATA code for Silchar Airport in Assam, India
- IXS Enterprise, a conceptual interstellar faster-than-light spacecraft designed by NASA scientist Dr. Harold G. White
- Inelastic X-ray scattering (IXS)
