= Swamp Works =

Cutting-edge research laboratory at Kennedy Space Center, FL, US (founded 2012)

Coordinates: 28.5225°N 80.6426°W

KSC Swamp Works
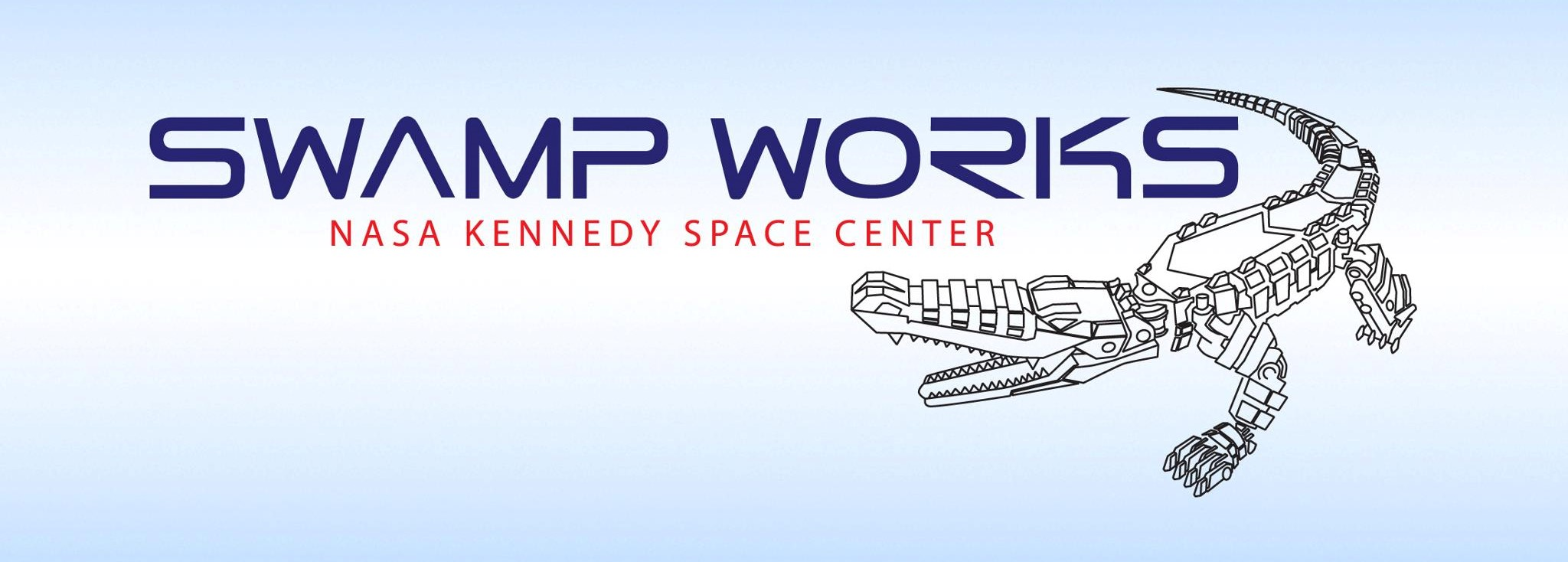
- Established: 2012; 14 years ago
- Research type: Unclassified
- Director: Robert Mueller
- Location: Kennedy Space Center, Florida
- Operating agency: NASA
- Website: Swamp Works website

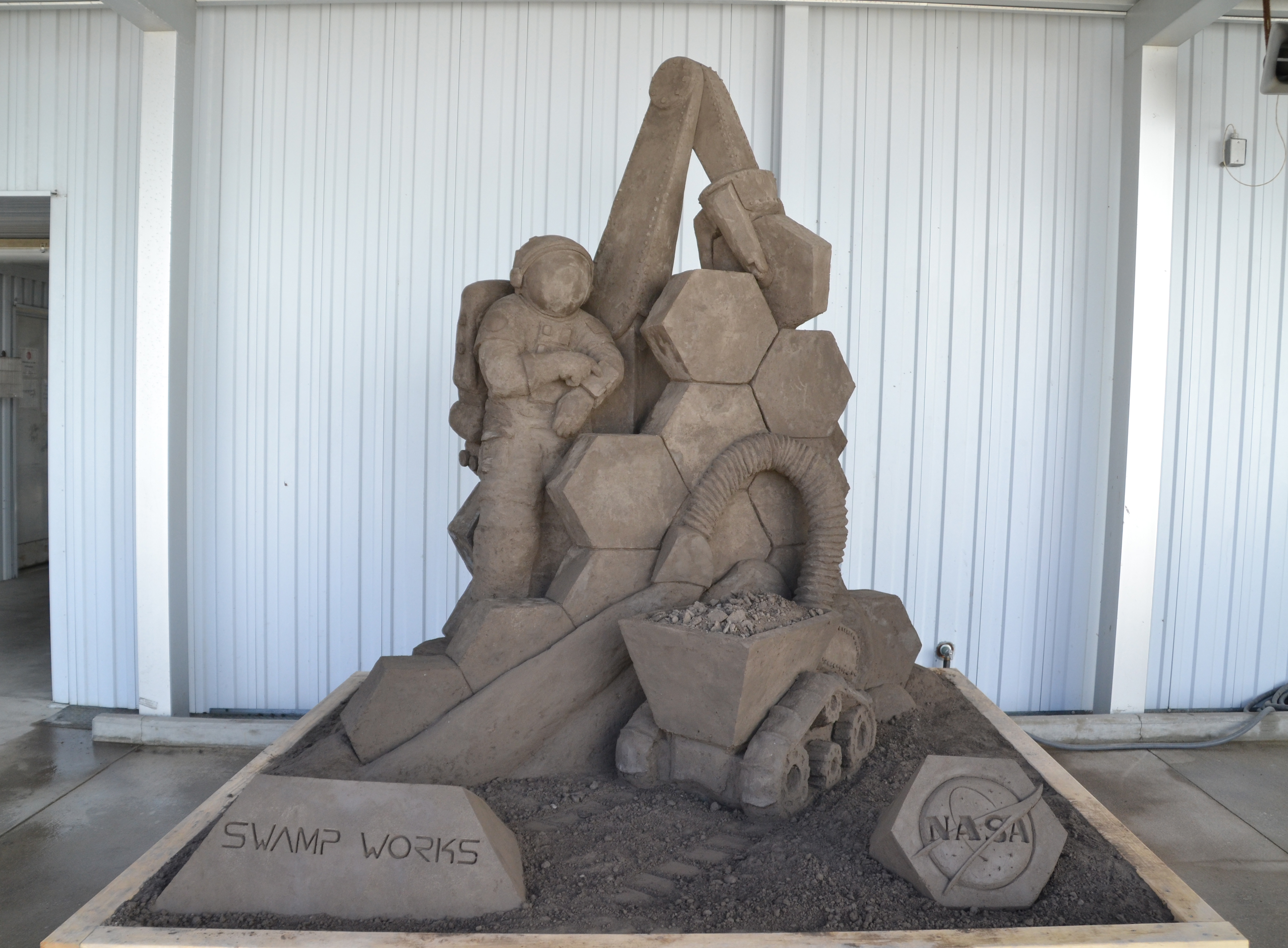
At the Swamp Works, a sculpture made of lunar soil simulant representing construction on the Moon by robots working together with humans.

The Swamp Works is a lean-development, rapid innovation environment at NASA's Kennedy Space Center. It was founded in 2012, when four laboratories in the Surface Systems Office were merged into an enlarged facility with a modified philosophy for rapid technology development. Those laboratories are the Granular Mechanics and Regolith Operations Lab, the Electrostatics and Surface Physics Lab, the Applied Chemistry Lab, and the Life Support and Habitation Systems (LSHS) team. The first two of these are located inside the main Swamp Works building, while the other two use the facility although their primary work is located elsewhere. The team developed the Swamp Works operating philosophy from Kelly Johnson's Skunk Works, including the "14 Rules of Management", from the NASA development shops of Wernher von Braun, and from the innovation culture of Silicon Valley. The team prototypes space technologies rapidly to learn early in the process how to write better requirements, enabling them to build better products, rapidly, and at reduced cost. It was named the Swamp Works for similarity with the Skunk Works and the Phantom Works, but branded by the widespread marshes (swamps) on the Cape Canaveral and Merritt Island property of the Kennedy Space Center. The Swamp Works was co-founded by NASA engineers and scientists Jack Fox, Rob Mueller, and Philip Metzger. The logo, a robotic alligator, was designed by Rosie Mueller, a professional designer and the spouse of Rob Mueller.

== Swamp Works Facility ==
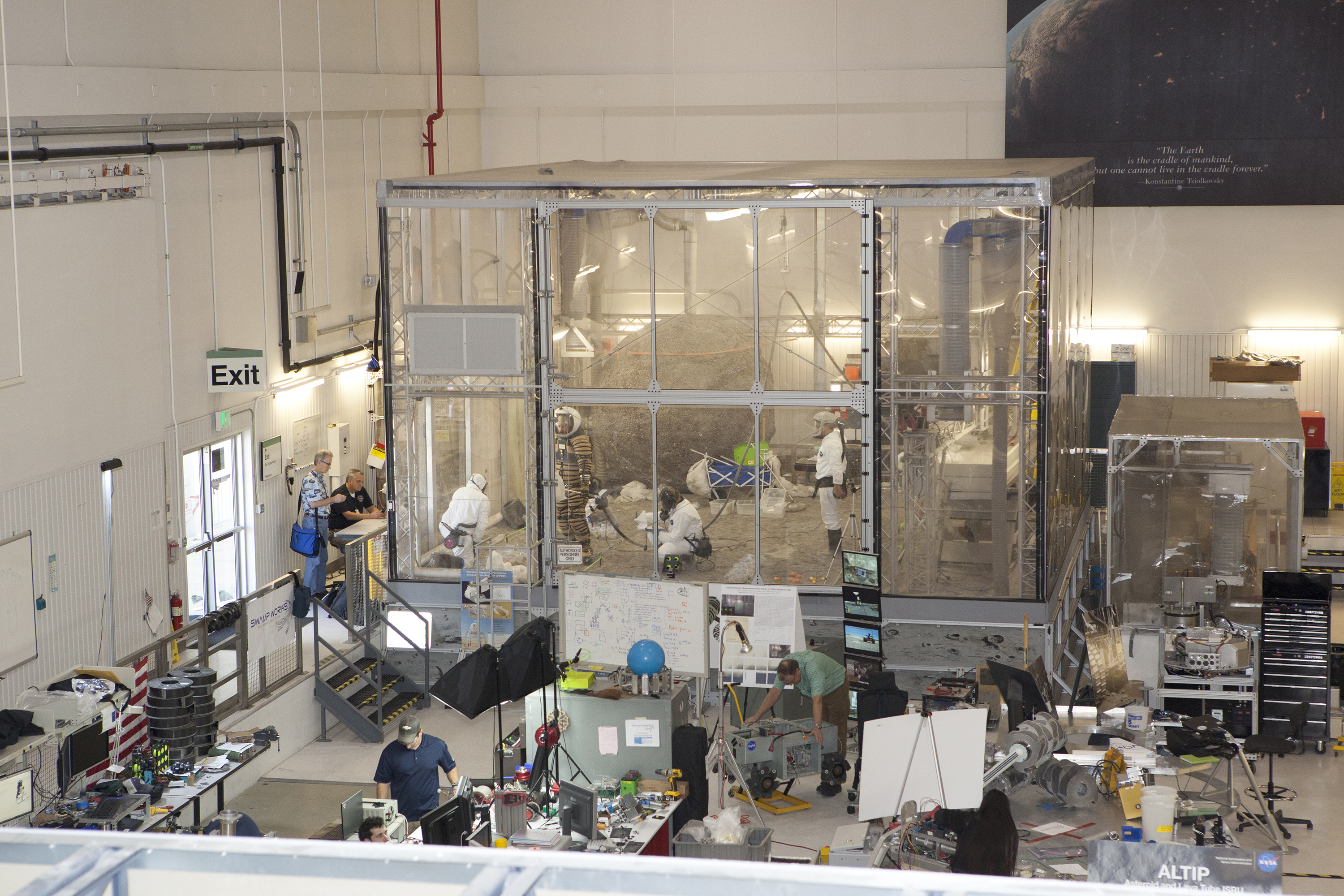
View inside the NASA KSC Swamp Works showing the regolith test bin

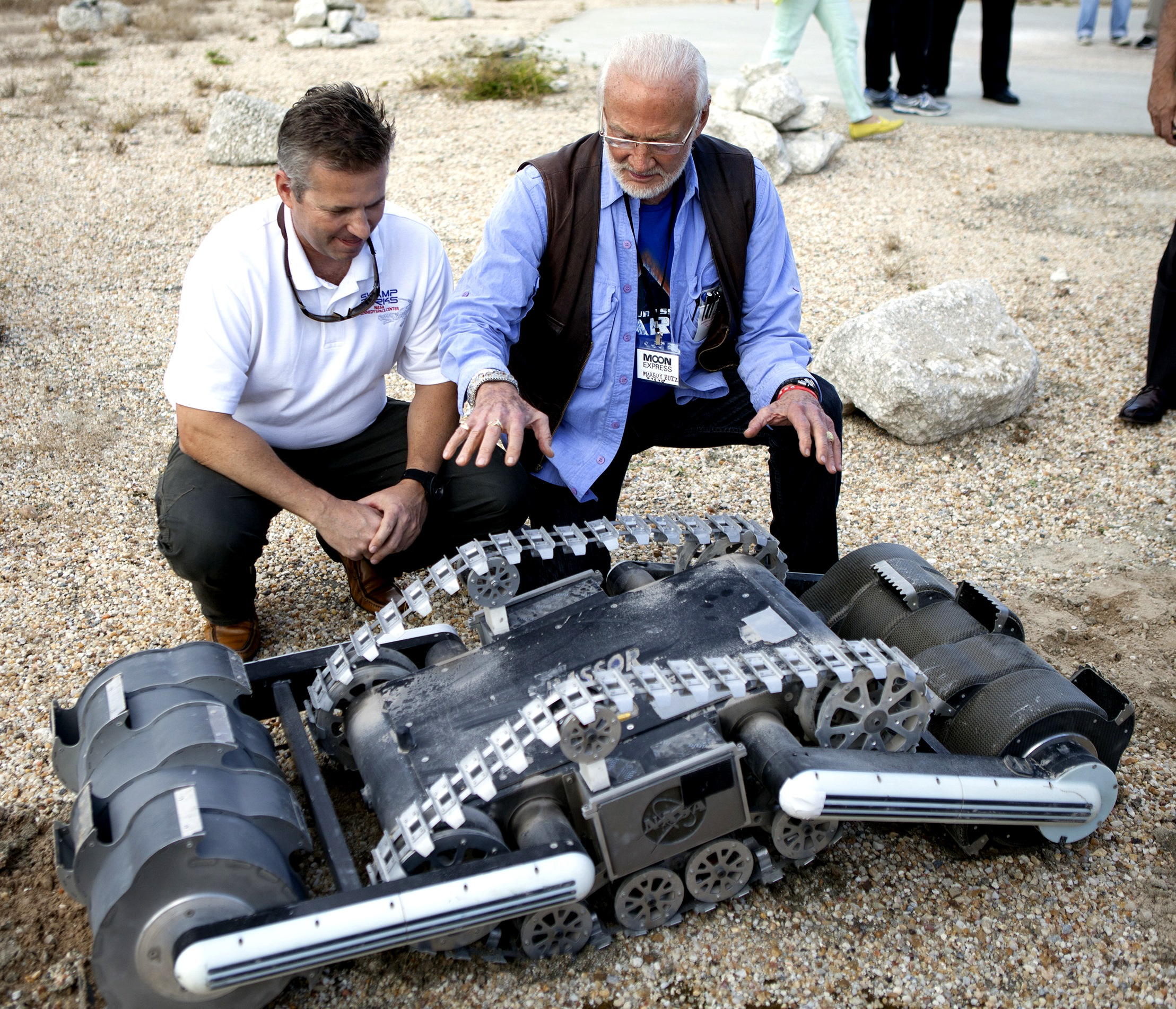
Rob Mueller talking with Apollo 11 astronaut and moonwalker Buzz Aldrin about the space mining robot RASSOR developed by the KSC Swamp Works.

The Swamp Works' main facility is the high bay in KSC's Engineering Development Lab, which was formerly the Astronaut Training Building during the NASA Apollo program. The building is where Apollo astronauts practiced working with the Lunar Module for lunar landings and extravehicular activities. During the Space Shuttle era it was used as a destination for bus tours from the KSC Visitor Complex. After the visitor complex decided it no longer needed the facility, it was handed back to NASA and was renovated for Swamp Works. The high bay was furnished with a lunar soil testing facility, the "Big Bin", which is thought to be the world's largest indoor, climate controlled lunar regolith chamber and contains 120 tons of BP-1 simulated lunar soil. The simulated soil is a finely crushed basalt from Black Point, Arizona, that has mechanical properties matching lunar soil. The facility has four 3D printers and an adjacent machine shop with lathes, drill presses, a CNC Router, and other equipment to enable rapid iterative prototyping. The facility also includes an Innovation Space where employees are encouraged to work informally in the upstairs loft.

== Granular Mechanics and Regolith Operations Lab ==
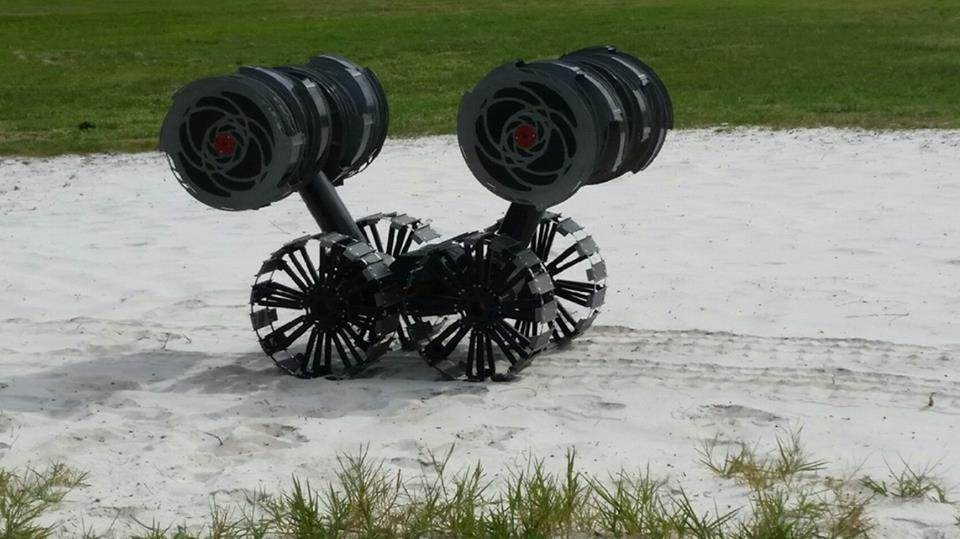
RASSOR is a fore-and-aft bucket drum mining robot for low gravity built by the KSC Swamp Works.

The Granular Mechanics and Regolith Operations (GMRO) Lab combines theoretical and experimental granular mechanics with applied robotics to operate with the soil on other planetary bodies, known as regolith. GMRO develops technologies to mine, convey, extract resources from, manufacture with, and construct infrastructure, like buildings and rocket landing pads, from regolith. GMRO also develops self-cleaning connectors for the dusty lunar and martian environments, performs research into rocket blast effects for landing or launching on the surfaces of the Moon, Mars or asteroids, and has developed a miniature space mining robot called the Regolith Advanced Surface Systems Operations Robot (RASSOR). RASSOR has fore-and-after counter-rotating bucket drums to dig in soil in almost zero gravity. The GMRO Lab is involved in organizing and judging the NASA Robotic Mining competition, held annually at the Kennedy Space Center each May, and the Swarmathon University Challenge for swarming robots. GMRO also built the KSC Hazard Field at the north end of the Space Shuttle's runway, which is a field of simulated craters and boulders in sandy regolith. The hazard field was used by the Morpheus Lander project for flight tests in 2013-2014. The GMRO Lab has a large industrial robot arm used for printing buildings from lunar or martian (simulated) regolith mixed with recycled plastic.

== Electrostatics and Surface Physics Lab ==
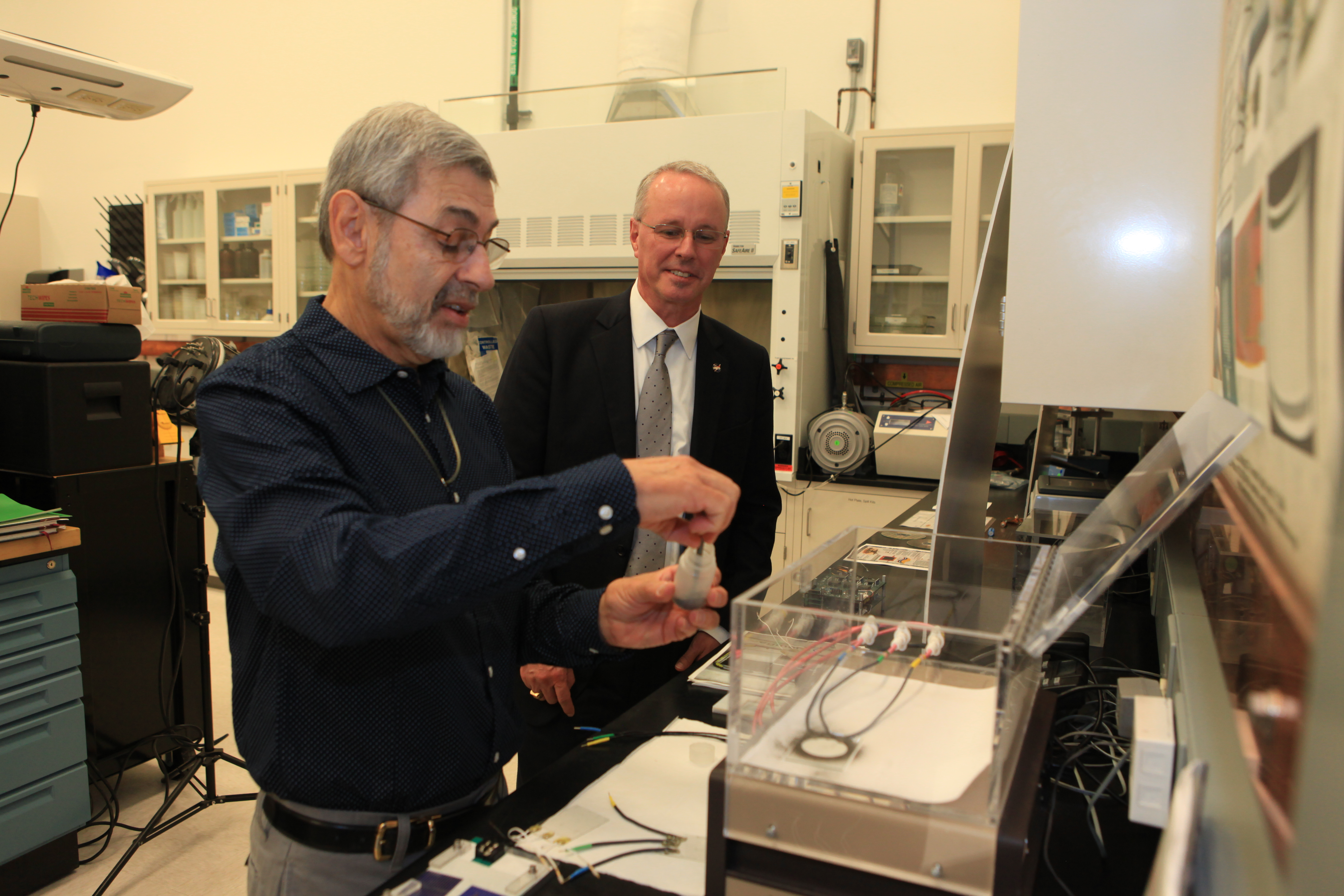
Carlos Calle demonstrating the Electrodynamic Dust Shield to the NASA Chief Technologist, David Miller

The Electrostatics and Surface Physics Lab (ESPL) develops technologies related to the unique physics that occur at material surfaces, leveraging it for applications in space. It developed an Electrodynamic Dust Shield that uses electrostatic forces that shift locations to sweep lunar or Martian dust from spacecraft surfaces. It created sensors that can be mounted into the wheels of planetary rovers to measure the spectrometry of tribocharging as an identification tool for the minerals it is driving over. It is also working on graphene as an energy storage medium. The ESPL and GMRO Lab worked together to develop a Mars Entry Heat Shield made out of regolith bonded by high temperature polymer. It could be made on the Martian moon Phobos then attached to a spacecraft from Earth to land on Mars, resulting in a cost savings for Mars missions.

== Applied Chemistry Lab ==
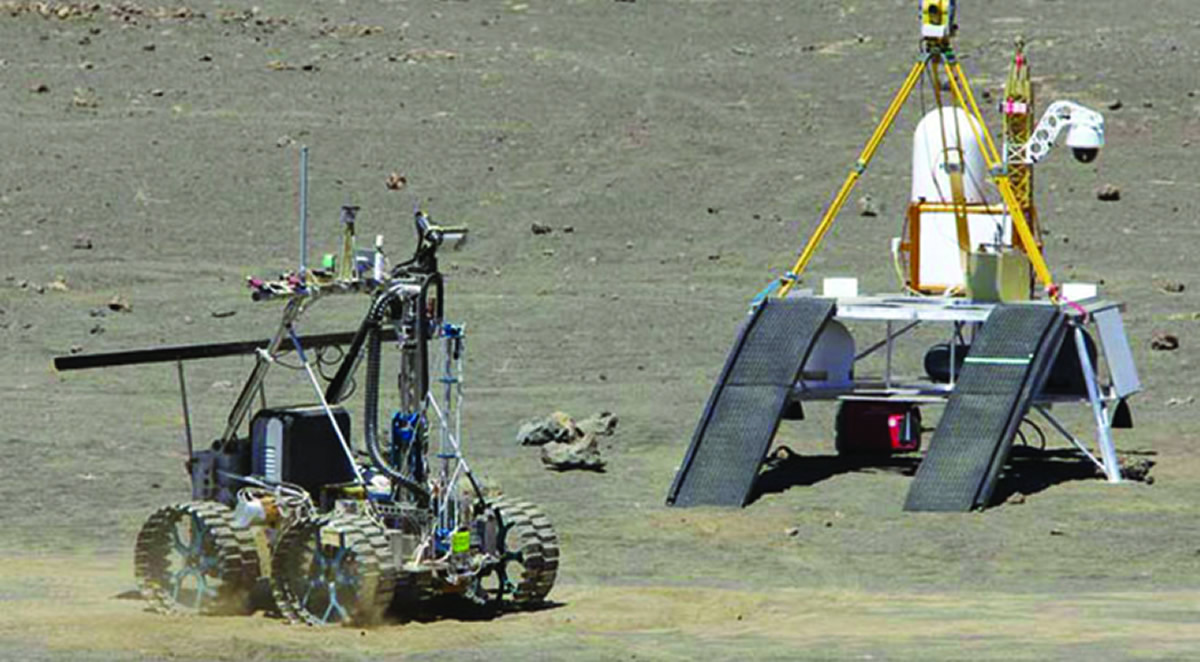
The RESOLVE lunar prospecting payload built by the Applied Chemistry Lab on a Canadian rover during a field test in Hawaii.

The Applied Chemistry Lab develops technologies to support launch activities on the Kennedy Space Center and for use on the surfaces of the Moon, Mars or asteroids. Technologies for terrestrial ground operations include toxic vapor detection and environmental remediation. Technologies for use in space include chemical extraction of resources from lunar or Martian soil, recycling packing materials from space launch to create methane and other needed gases, and development of payload instruments for prospecting lunar ice.

== Life Support and Habitation Systems Team ==
The Life Support and Habitation Systems team develops technologies in four main areas. The first is recovery and recycling of water onboard spacecraft. The second is controlling the trace amounts of chemicals such as ammonia that could build up in a spacecraft's enclosed atmosphere. The third is characterizing the microbial content of solid waste during space missions. The fourth is producing food through plant growth. The lab developed and operates the payload VEGGIE on board the International Space Station, which uses LED lighting at specific frequencies to cause plant growth with minimum energy.

== See also ==
- Breakthrough Propulsion Physics Program
- JPL
- NASA Eagleworks
