= Advanced Propulsion Physics Laboratory =

NASA cutting-edge research group, Johnson Space Center, TX, US

Logo of the laboratory

The Advanced Propulsion Physics Laboratory or "Eagleworks Laboratories" at NASA's Johnson Space Center is a small research group investigating a variety of theories regarding new forms of spacecraft propulsion. The principal investigator is Dr. Harold G. White.

The group is developing the White–Juday warp-field interferometer in the hope of observing small disturbances of spacetime and also testing small prototypes of thrusters that do not use reaction mass, with currently inconclusive results. The proposed principle of operation of these quantum vacuum plasma thrusters, such as the RF resonant cavity thruster ('EM Drive'), has been shown to be inconsistent with known laws of physics, including conservation of momentum and conservation of energy. No plausible theory of operation for such drives has been proposed.

== Purpose ==
The Advanced Propulsion Physics Laboratory is enabled by section 2.3.7 of the NASA Technology Roadmap TA 2: In Space Propulsion Technologies:

Breakthrough Propulsion: Breakthrough propulsion is an area of technology development that seeks to explore and develop a deeper understanding of the nature of space-time, gravitation, inertial frames, quantum vacuum, and other fundamental physical phenomena, with the overall objective of developing advanced propulsion applications and systems that will revolutionize how NASA explores space.

The lab's purpose is to explore, investigate, and pursue advanced and theoretical propulsion technologies that are intended to allow human exploration of the Solar System in the next 50 years with the ultimate goal of interstellar travel by the turn of the century. The 30x40 ft floor of the lab facility floats on large pneumatic piers in order to isolate it from any seismic activity. The pneumatic piers were originally built for the Apollo program and used to perform work involving inertial measurement units (IMU) before being brought out of retirement.

== See also ==
- Boeing Phantom Works, advanced projects division
- Breakthrough Propulsion Physics Program
- JPL
- Lockheed Skunk Works, advanced projects division
- NASA Swamp Works
