= Harold G. White =

NASA engineer and physicist (born 1965)

Harold White
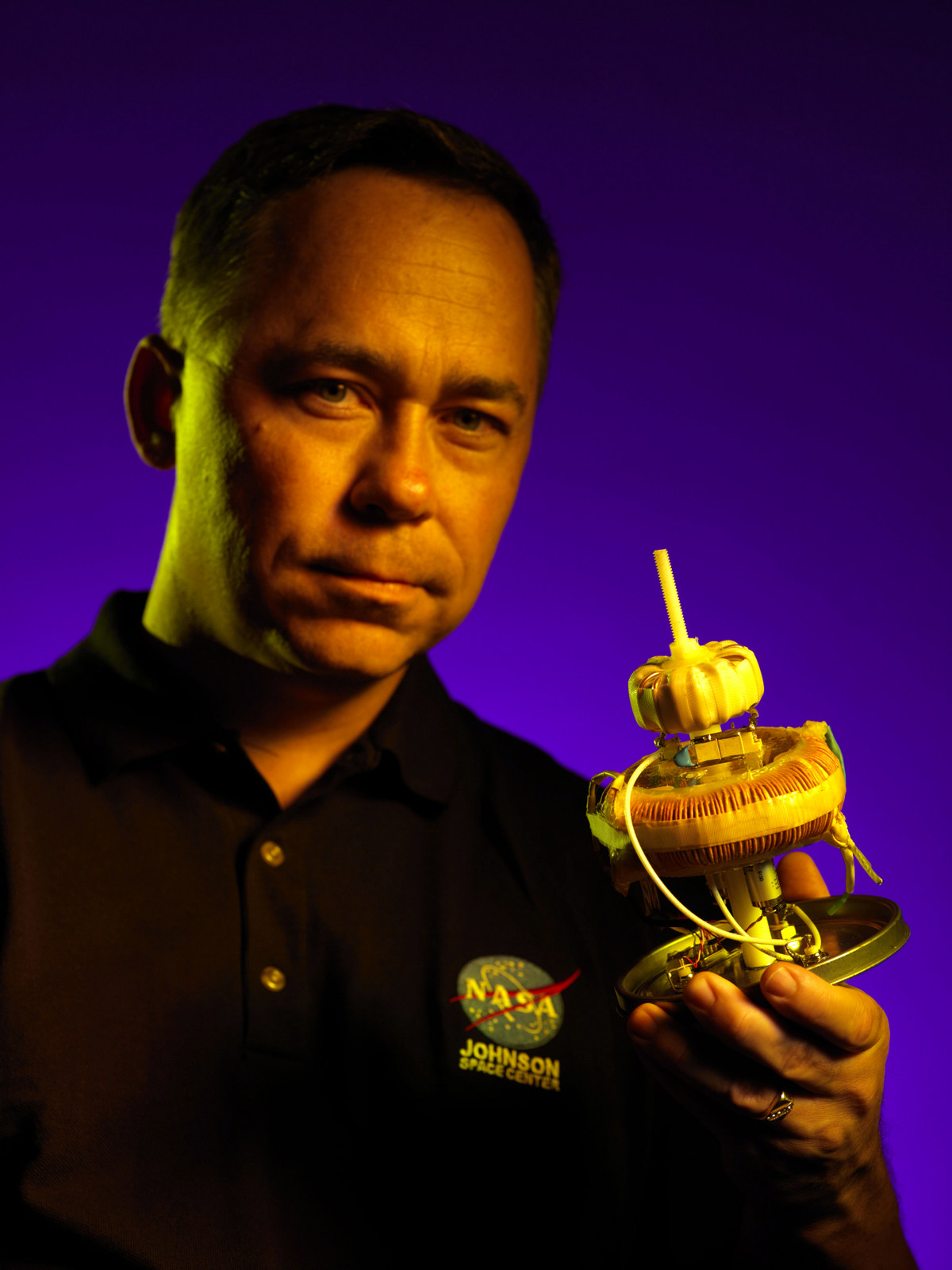
- NASA file photo of Harold "Sonny" White
- Born: Harold Sonny White; 8 October 1965 (age 60)
- Education: University of South Alabama (B.S.); Wichita State University (M.S.); Rice University (PhD)
- Awards: NASA Exceptional Achievement Medal (2006); Silver Snoopy Award
- Scientific career
- Thesis: Analysis of Low Frequency Whistler Wave Occurrences in the Nightside Venus Ionsphere (2007)

Harold G. "Sonny" White (born October 8, 1965) is a mechanical engineer, aerospace engineer, and applied physicist who is known for proposing new Alcubierre drive concepts and promoting advanced propulsion projects.

== Educational ==
White obtained a B.S. degree in mechanical engineering from University of South Alabama, an M.S. degree in mechanical engineering from Wichita State University in 1999, and a Ph.D. degree in Physics from Rice University in 2008.

== Alcubierre "warp" drive ==
White attracted the attention of the press when he began presenting his ideas at space conventions and publishing proposals for Alcubierre drive concepts. In 2011, he released a paper titled Warp Field Mechanics 101 that outlined an updated concept of Miguel Alcubierre's faster-than-light propulsion concept, including methods to prove the feasibility of the project. Alcubierre's concept had been considered infeasible because it required far more power than any viable energy source could produce. White re-calculated the Alcubierre concept and proposed that if the warp bubble around a spacecraft were shaped like a torus, it would be much more energy efficient and make the concept feasible. White has stated that "warp travel" has not yet seen a "Chicago Pile-1" experiment, a reference to the very first nuclear reactor, the breakthrough demonstration that paved the way for nuclear power.

To investigate the feasibility of a warp drive, White and his team have designed a warp field interferometer test bed to demonstrate warp field phenomena. The experiments are taking place at NASA's Advanced Propulsion Physics Laboratory ("Eagleworks") at the Johnson Space Center. White and his team claim that this modified Michelson interferometer will detect distortion of spacetime, a warp field effect.

In May 2021 White and his team announced that they might have found the right configuration required to test a "chip-scale" Alcubierre drive.

== EmDrive ==
In April 2015, the space enthusiast website NASASpaceFlight.com announced, based on a post on their site's forum by NASA Eagleworks engineer Paul March, that NASA had successfully tested their EM Drive in a hard vacuum – which would be the first time any organization has claimed such a successful test. In November, 2016, Harold White, along with other colleagues at NASA's Eagleworks program published their findings on the proposed EM Drive. The proposed principle of operation for this device was shown to be inconsistent with known laws of physics, including conservation of momentum and conservation of energy. No plausible theory of operation for such drives has been proposed.

In March 2021, physicists at the Dresden University of Technology published three papers claiming that all results showing thrust were false positives, explained by outside forces.

== Other works ==
White and his team are also working on several other "breakthrough space technology" projects, including a new thruster concept, another concept White claims works by utilizing effects predicted by quantum mechanics. To support this research, White's team also is developing a "micro-balance" that is capable of measuring the extremely small forces predicted to be produced by this thruster. To calibrate this balance the team plans to repeat an unsuccessful 2006 Woodward effect experiment, this time using the new micro-balance.

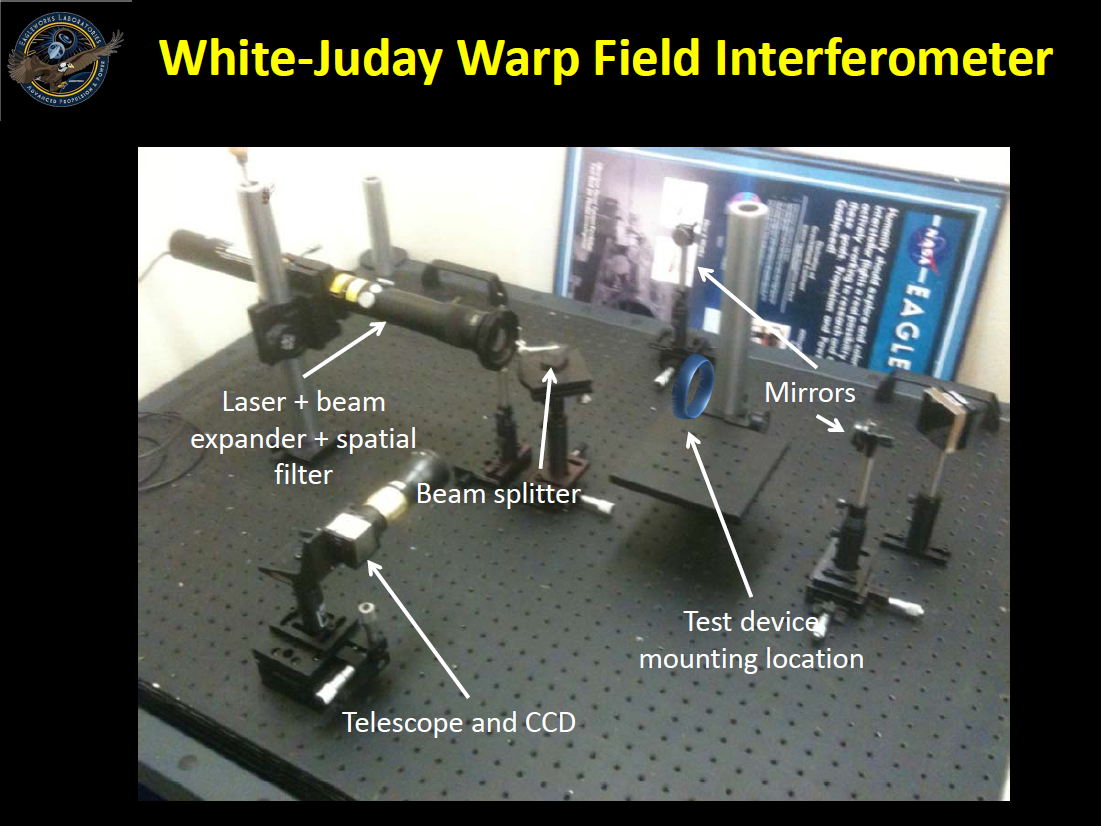
Photo of the White-Juday warp field interferometer experiment

Together with retired Johnson Space Center employee Richard Juday, White invented the "White-Juday warp field interferometer", which uses a laser beam, a beamsplitter, and a charge-coupled device camera to detect whether a test device warps spacetime.

== Awards ==
In 2006, White was awarded the NASA Exceptional Achievement Medal by the NASA administrator for his role in getting the Thermal Protection System robotic inspection tools built, delivered, and certified during the Space Shuttle's return to flight. White has also received the Silver Snoopy Award from the NASA crew office for "his actions in the discovery and disposition of critical damage to the robotic arm prior to the Space Shuttle STS-121 mission."

== See also ==
- 100 Year Starship
- IXS Enterprise
