= Dean drive =

Pseudoscientific drive promoted by its inventor

Inventor Norman L. Dean beside one of his "Dean drive" apparatuses.

The Dean drive was a device created and promoted by inventor Norman Lorimer Dean (1902–1972) that he claimed to be a reactionless drive. Dean claimed that his device was able to generate a uni-directional force in free space, in violation of Newton's third law of motion from classical physics. His claims generated notoriety because, if true, such a device would have had enormous applications, completely changing human transport, engineering, space travel and more. Dean made several controlled private demonstrations of a number of different devices; however, no working models were ever demonstrated publicly or subjected to independent analysis and Dean never presented any rigorous theoretical basis for their operation. Analysts conclude that the motion seen in Dean's device demonstrations was likely reliant on asymmetrical frictional resistance between the device and the surface on which the device was set ("stick and slip"), resulting in the device moving in one direction when in operation, driven by the vibrations of the apparatus.

== Early publicity ==
The Dean drive obtained a good deal of publicity in the 1950s and 1960s via the columns and conference presentations of John W. Campbell, the longtime editor of Astounding Science Fiction magazine. At that time, Campbell believed that his magazine had to change society by helping breakthrough research that was rejected by "mainstream" science, and he promoted a series of far-reaching ideas that had dubious scientific bases, like Dianetics, dowsing, the Hieronymus machine, and the Dean drive. Campbell believed that the device worked and claimed to have witnessed it operating on a bathroom scale. The weight reading on the scale appeared to decrease when the device was activated. He subsequently published photographs of the scale with the drive stopped and running. The June 1960 cover of Astounding magazine featured a painting of a United States submarine near Mars, supposedly propelled there by a Dean drive.

Dean, who was trying to find potential buyers for his technology, was secretive about the details of how it was supposed to work, but it was said to contain asymmetrical rotating weights and to generate a great deal of vibration.

Dean and Campbell claimed that Newton's laws of motion were only an approximation, and that Dean had discovered a fourth law of motion. This has been described as a nonlinear correction to one of Newton's laws, which, if correct, would allegedly have rendered a reactionless drive feasible after all.

One result of the initial articles in Campbell's magazine was that two other researchers, William O. Davis and G. Harry Stine, visited Dean and witnessed a demonstration. Results of this visit were published in the May 1962 and June 1976 issues of the magazine, the name of which had been changed by Campbell from Astounding to Analog. Davis witnessed a demonstration by Dean, and wrote: "It was the conclusion of both Harry Stine and myself that we had witnessed a real anomaly and that the possibility of fraud in the demonstration was slim." Aerospace researcher Jerry Pournelle—who, like Stine, was a science fiction writer—pointed out that Stine was well qualified to make a judgment on the device, but that he was more gullible than other persons.

Davis's 1962 article was titled, "The Fourth Law of Motion", and described a hypothesis in which Dean's device (and others) could conserve momentum invisibly via "gravitational-inertial radiation". One detail of Davis's hypothesis involved the forces of action and reaction—physical bodies can respond to those forces nonsimultaneously, or "out of phase" with each other.

"Detesters, Phasers and Dean Drives", a 1976 article by Davis, reported his tests with Stine, an engineer who built devices to test that aspect of the hypothesis. Stine said they were able to reliably create and reproduce a 3-degree phase angle in a linear system, which was not possible according to ordinary physics. But then they failed to reproduce the effect in a pendulum system, using a rocket-powered ballistic pendulum. The pendulum test would have proved beyond doubt that the drive worked, but Dean refused to subject the original Dean drive to a pendulum test. Campbell reported that he had seen the drive subjected to a pendulum test, but Davis and Stine suspect that he only reported what Dean had told him and had never seen the actual test. Davis says the question can't be settled until the pendulum test is made. Their research was terminated in 1965 when the national economy took a downturn, and was never resumed. The 1976 article was an attempt to get research restarted, but apparently failed.

In 1984, physicist Amit Goswami wrote that "Dean's machine made such a splash with readers of science fiction that it is now customary in SF circles to refer to a reactionless drive as a Dean drive."

=== Purported weight loss ===
Dean made a demonstration for a representative of the magazine Popular Mechanics of one of his "Dean drive" devices. The witness reported that "While suspended above the ground, was able to pull a load to itself without itself being pulled toward the load". Another version of the machine was reported to be "able to apply a force to a hand, without moving—yet when the machine was turned off an equivalent force applied by the hand easily moved the machine". William O. Davis, who witnessed the latter demonstration, wrote in his notebook about Dean's explanation of how the device worked, "... does not strike me as valid ... For this reason I have decided to undertake a theoretical study of dynamic systems to see if a concept can be evolved which will describe a world in which Dean's Drive can exist and yet where other known facts are not contradicted." Davis produced a hypothesis, and it was published in Analog in 1962.

Later analysis has revealed that the interactions of vibration, friction, and resonance with the springs of the scale are likely the root cause of the apparent weight loss reported by Campbell and others of apparent "anti-gravity" and "reactionless thruster" effects.

In the 1950s Jerry Pournelle, working for an aerospace company, contacted Dean to investigate purchasing the device. Dean refused to demonstrate the device without pre-payment and promise of a Nobel Prize. Pournelle's company were unwilling to pay for the right to examine the device and never saw the purported model. 3M sent representatives about the same time, and obtained similar results. Pournelle eventually was convinced that Dean's device never worked.

== Patents ==
Dean was granted two U.S. patents on mechanical devices presumably related to his Dean drive claims. His first patent for a "System for converting rotary motion into unidirectional motion" was granted on May 9, 1959. Another patent for a "Variable oscillator system" was granted on May 11, 1965. These two patent designs were the only ones where Dean revealed the design details with an explanation for operation. However, the details were incomplete, and it is not possible to build a Dean drive just from the explanations in the patent. Dean's patents, as well as patents for many other similar devices, have been analyzed and it has been determined that none can produce net directional thrust in free space or operate without violating Newton's third law. Dean also demonstrated other mechanical devices that were clearly different from his patent designs but apparently never sought patents for them nor otherwise revealed their design details or theory of operation.

In 1978 physicist Russell Adams wrote an article in Analog. Searching in the US patent office he had found at least 50 patents for similar reactionless drives. After studying the mechanisms, he concluded that they all relied on friction against the floor they were placed on, and they would be useless in space, where there isn't friction against any surface.

Dean's patented devices, and his explanation of how his drive was supposed to work, were later shown to develop no net weight loss over time and do not violate Newton's third law of motion. Many other inventors claim to have invented similar devices, and they all still remain unproven, and lacking a solid theoretic basis.

== Later developments ==
After Dean's death, neither the demonstration devices nor any working devices were found among his experiments. The demonstration devices were clearly different from the devices patented by Dean, and no diagrams were ever found for them. Consequently, it is impossible to test Dean's reported designs or devices to see if they worked as he claimed.

In 1997 physicist John G. Cramer mentioned the Dean drive in Analog in his column "Alternate View". He said that the demonstration made to Campbell was faulty, and the drive had turned out to be bogus, like many other claims of antigravity devices.

In 2006 a NASA technical memorandum presented the Dean drive as the most famous example of an "oscillation thruster" and examined its theoretical basis and feasibility as a space drive. It said that "Regrettably, such devices are not breakthroughs, since they still require a connection to the ground to create net motion. The ground is the reaction mass and the frictional connection to the ground is a necessary component to its operation." NASA regularly receives proposals of similar devices, and the memo recommended that future reviews of said proposals "should require that submitters meet minimal thresholds of proof before engaging in further correspondence."

== See also ==
- Eric Laithwaite, a UK inventor who made similar claims.
- Reactionless drive
- EmDrive
