= Philip T. Metzger =

American planetary physicist

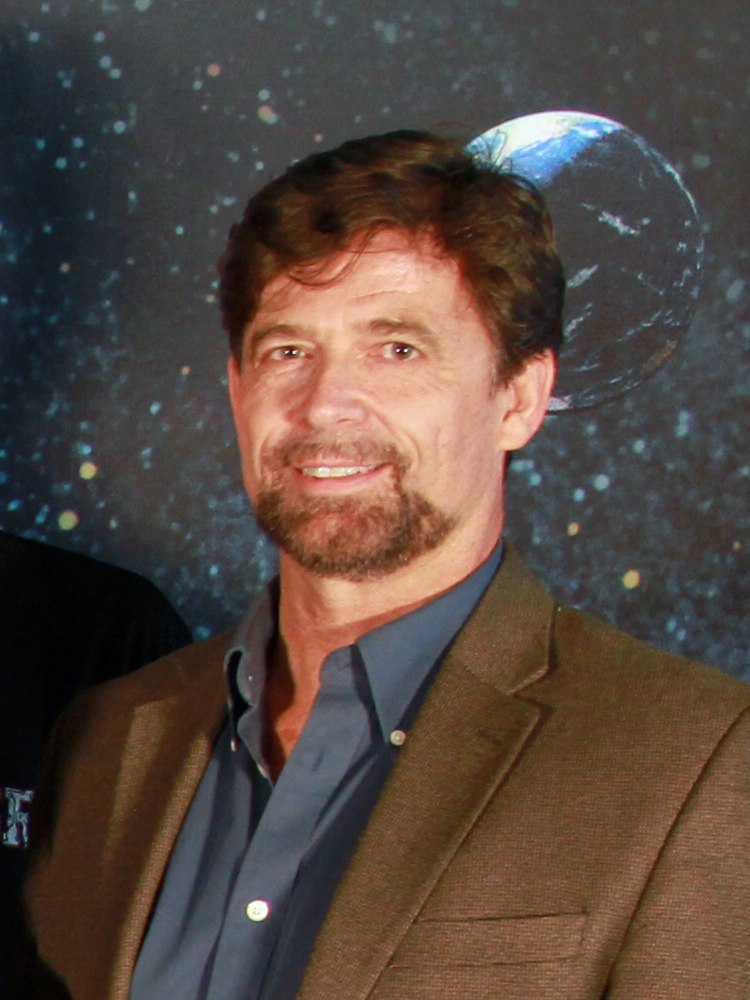
- Born: 1962
- Alma mater: Auburn University; University of Central Florida; University of Central Florida
- Awards: Outstanding Technical Contribution Award (2018)
- Website: sciences.ucf.edu/physics/person/phillip-metzger/
- Academic career
- Institutions: Kennedy Space Center (1985–1995); Kennedy Space Center (1995–2002); Kennedy Space Center (2002–2014); University of Central Florida (2014–)

Philip T. Metzger is an American planetary physicist with the Florida Space Institute. In 2012 he co-founded NASA's Swamp Works, and in May 2018 he was honoured with the Outstanding Technical Contribution Award from the American Society of Civil Engineers, later that year he worked with Honeybee Robotics to develop the WINE spacecraft prototype. Metzger disagrees with the IAU definition of a planet.

A 4.6 km (2.9 mi) wide main-belt asteroid discovered on June 1, 2000 at the Anderson Mesa Station has been named after Metzger: 36329 Philmetzger.
