= IXS Enterprise =

Conceptual interstellar ship

The IXS Enterprise as imagined by Mark Rademaker

IXS Enterprise is a conceptual interstellar superluminal spacecraft designed by NASA scientist Dr. Harold G. White, revealed at SpaceVision 2013, designed for the goal of achieving warp travel. The conceptual spacecraft would make use of a modified version of the Alcubierre drive. Dr. White is currently running the White–Juday warp-field interferometer experiment in order to develop a proof of concept for Alcubierre-style warp travel, when possible. The Alcubierre drive uses exotic matter (not to be confused with antimatter) to travel faster than light.

While the concept had been out since 2013, the design of IXS Enterprise was popularized in June 2014 after a series of media outlets reported on the conceptual artwork done by Dutch artist Mark Rademaker in collaboration with NASA. According to Mark Rademaker, over 1,600 hours have been spent on the conceptual artwork that he created.

In 2012, NASA reported that it was experimenting with the concept of warp drive and the loophole within Einstein's theory of relativity. By 2014, it was announced that designer Mark Rademaker had created a CGI representation of a new vessel that would achieve warp velocity. The vessel he designed was the IXS Enterprise, named after the famed ship of the Star Trek franchise. The energy required to power the warp drive, according to White, is approximately the negative (negative energy is required for the Alcubierre drive concept to function) mass–energy equivalence of Voyager 1, which has a mass of approximately 700 kilograms. Using E=mc^{2}, −700 kilograms of mass is equivalent to ~−63 exajoules of energy (this number is not definitive and can be further reduced). The ship has two thick outer rings (to reduce required energy) that generate the warp field—a contraction of space ahead, and expansion of space behind it. The space inside the rings is optimized to fit more space for cargo, crew and equipment.

== See also ==
- Breakthrough Starshot
- Interstellar probe
- Interstellar travel
- Project Icarus
- Project Longshot
- Quantum vacuum plasma thruster (related technology)
- 100 Year Starship
- Starship
