= Skunk Works =

Aerospace research facility in the United States

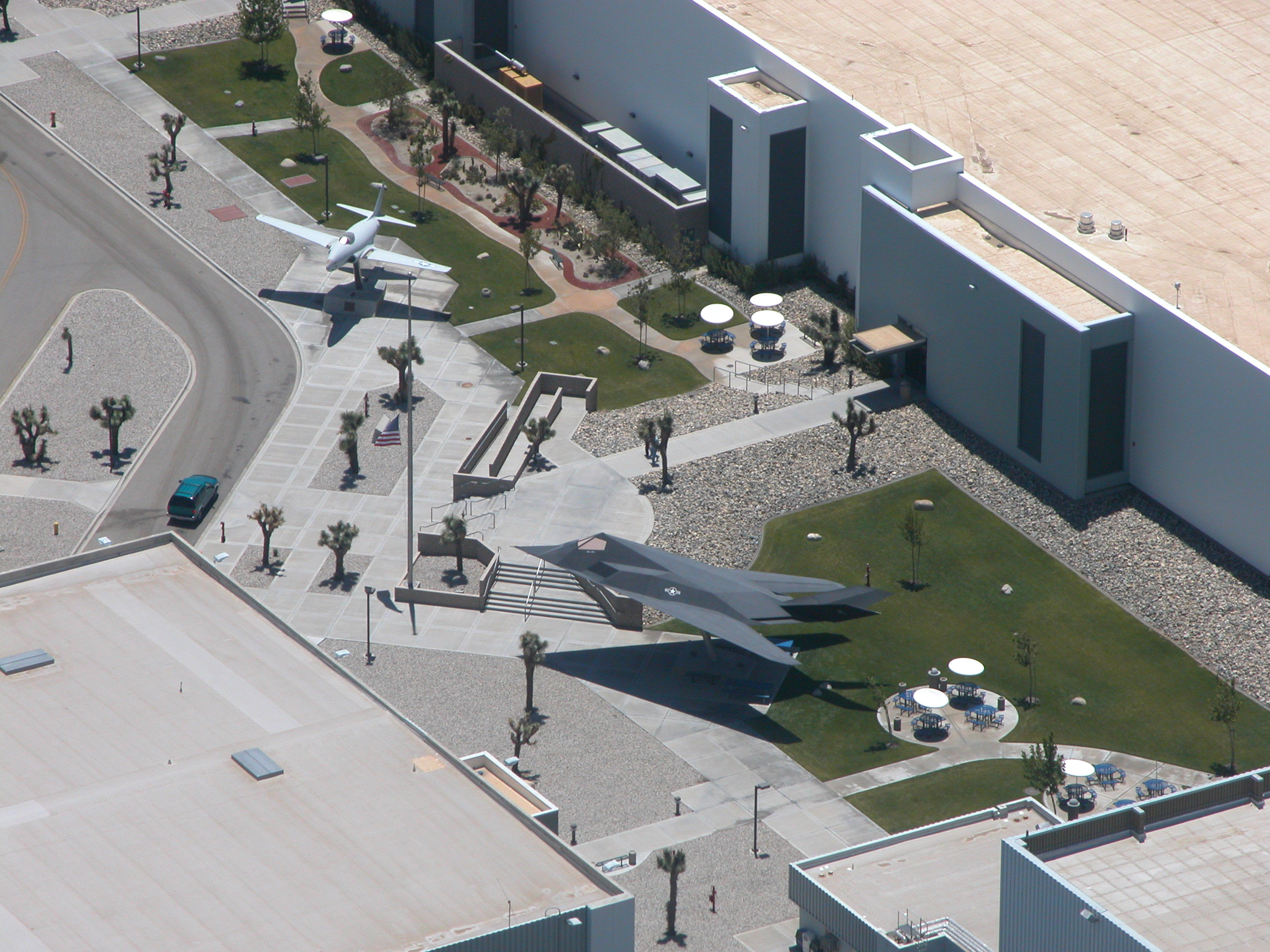
Entrance plaza at the Skunk Works in Palmdale, California, 2004

Skunk Works is an official pseudonym for Lockheed Martin's Advanced Development Programs (ADP), the company's tactical research and development arm. It is responsible for a number of aircraft designs, highly classified development programs, and exotic aircraft platforms. Although locations for this group are typically classified, publicly-known locations have been reported on United States Air Force manufacturing bases Plant 42 (Palmdale), Plant 4 (Fort Worth), and Plant 6 (Marietta).

Skunk Works' history dates back to the original Lockheed Corporation and started with the P-38 Lightning in 1939 and the P-80 Shooting Star in 1943. During this time, the group was called Lockheed Advanced Development Projects. Skunk Works engineers subsequently developed the U-2, SR-71 Blackbird, F-117 Nighthawk, F-22 Raptor, and F-35 Lightning II, the latter being used in the air forces of several countries. From the development of these planes and future projects, the program would accrue eight Collier Trophies and a National Medal of Technology and Innovation.

The Skunk Works name was taken from the "Skonk Oil" factory in the comic strip Li'l Abner. The modern term "skunkworks" is widely used in American business, engineering, and technical fields to describe a group within an organization given a high degree of autonomy and unhampered by bureaucracy, with the task of working on advanced or secret projects.

== History ==
There are conflicting observations about the birth of Skunk Works. Engineer Ben Rich sets the origin as June 1943 in Burbank, California. Kelly Johnson has made contradictory statements, some agreeing with Rich, and others putting the origin earlier, in 1939. The official Lockheed Skunk Works story states:

The Air Tactical Service Command (ATSC) of the Army Air Force met with Lockheed Aircraft Corporation to express its need for a jet fighter. A rapidly growing German jet threat gave Lockheed an opportunity to develop an airframe around the most powerful jet engine that the allied forces had access to, the British Goblin. Lockheed was chosen to develop the jet because of its past interest in jet development and its previous contracts with the Air Force. One month after the ATSC and Lockheed meeting, the young engineer Clarence L. "Kelly" Johnson and other associate engineers hand delivered the initial XP-80 proposal to the ATSC. Two days later the go-ahead was given to Lockheed to start development and the Skunk Works was born, with Kelly Johnson at the helm. The formal contract for the XP-80 did not arrive at Lockheed until October 16, 1943; some four months after work had already begun. This would prove to be a common practice within the Skunk Works. Many times a customer would come to the Skunk Works with a request and on a handshake the project would begin, with no contracts in place, no official submittal process. Kelly Johnson and his Skunk Works team designed and built the XP-80 in only 143 days, seven fewer than was required.

Warren M. Bodie, journalist, historian, and Skunk Works engineer from 1977 to 1984, wrote that engineering independence, elitism and secrecy of the Skunk Works variety were demonstrated earlier when Lockheed was asked by Lieutenant Benjamin S. Kelsey (later air force brigadier general) to build for the United States Army Air Corps a high speed, high altitude fighter to compete with German aircraft. In July 1938, while the rest of Lockheed was busy tooling up to build Hudson reconnaissance bombers to fill a British contract, a small group of engineers was assigned to fabricate the first prototype of what would become the P-38 Lightning. Kelly Johnson set them apart from the rest of the factory in a walled-off section of one building, off limits to all but those involved directly. Secretly, a number of advanced features were being incorporated into the new fighter including a significant structural revolution in which the aluminum skin of the aircraft was joggled, fitted and flush-riveted, a design innovation not called for in the army's specification but one that would yield less aerodynamic drag and give greater strength with lower mass.

As a result, the XP-38 was the first 400-mph fighter in the world. The Lightning team was temporarily moved to the 3G Distillery, a former bourbon works where the first YP-38 (constructor's number 2202) was built. Moving from the distillery to a larger building, the stench from a nearby plastic factory was so vile that Irv Culver, one of the engineers, began answering the intra-Lockheed "house" phone "Skonk Works, inside man Culver speaking!"

In Al Capp's comic strip Li'l Abner, Big Barnsmell's Skonk Works—spelled with an "o"—was where Skonk Oil was brewed from skunks, old shoes, kerosene, anvils, and other strange ingredients. When the name leaked out, Lockheed ordered it changed to "Skunk Works" to avoid potential legal trouble over use of a copyrighted term. The term rapidly circulated throughout the aerospace community, and became a common nickname for research and development offices. The once informal nickname is now a registered trademark of Lockheed Martin.

In November 1941, Kelsey gave the unofficial nod to Johnson and the P-38 team to engineer a drop tank system to extend range for the fighter, and they completed the initial research and development without a contract. When the Army Air Forces officially asked for a range extension solution it was ready. The range modifications were performed in Lockheed's Building 304, starting with 100 P-38F models on April 15, 1942. Some of the group of independent-minded engineers were later involved with the XP-80 project, the prototype of the P-80 Shooting Star.

Mary G. Ross, the first Native American female engineer, began working at Lockheed in 1942 on the mathematics of compressibility in high-speed flight—a problem first seriously encountered in the P-38. In 1952, she was invited to join the Skunk Works team.

=== 1950s to 1990s ===
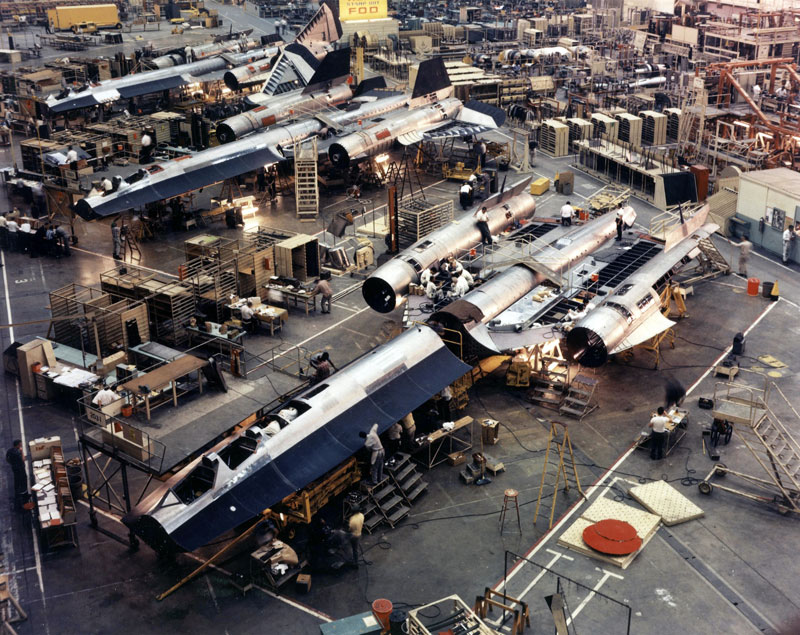
Assembly line of the SR-71 Blackbird at Skunk Works, 1965

In 1955, the Skunk Works received a contract from the CIA to build a spyplane known as the U-2 with the intention of flying over the Soviet Union and photographing sites of strategic interest. The U-2 was tested at Groom Lake in the Nevada desert, and the Flight Test Engineer in charge was Joseph F. Ware, Jr. The first overflight took place on July 4 1956. The U-2 ceased overflights when Francis Gary Powers was shot down during a mission on May 1, 1960, while over Russia.

The Skunk Works had predicted that the U-2 would have a limited operational life over the Soviet Union. The CIA agreed. In late 1959, Skunk Works received a contract to build five A-12 aircraft at a cost of $96 million. Building a Mach 3.0+ aircraft out of titanium posed enormous difficulties, and the first flight did not occur until 1962. (Titanium supply was largely dominated by the Soviet Union, so the CIA used several shell corporations to acquire source material.) Several years later, the U.S. Air Force became interested in the design, and it ordered the SR-71 Blackbird, a two-seater version of the A-12. This aircraft first flew in 1966 and remained in service until 1998.

The D-21 drone, similar in design to the Blackbird, was built to overfly the Lop Nur nuclear test facility in China. This drone was launched from the back of a specially modified A-12, known as M-21, of which there were two built. After a fatal mid-air collision on the fourth launch, the drones were re-built as D-21Bs, and launched with a rocket booster from B-52s. Four operational missions were conducted over China, but the camera packages were never successfully recovered. Kelly Johnson headed the Skunk Works until 1975. He was succeeded by Ben Rich.

In 1976, the Skunk Works began production on a pair of stealth technology demonstrators for the U.S. Air Force named Have Blue in Building 82 at Burbank. These scaled-down demonstrators, built in only 18 months, were a revolutionary step forward in aviation technology because of their extremely small radar cross-section. After a series of successful test flights beginning in 1977, the Air force awarded Skunk Works the contract to build the F-117 stealth fighter on November 1, 1978.

During the entirety of the Cold War, the Skunk Works was located in Burbank, California, on the eastern side of Burbank-Glendale-Pasadena Airport (34.200768°N 118.351826°W). After 1989, Lockheed reorganized its operations and relocated the Skunk Works to Site 10 at U.S. Air Force Plant 42 in Palmdale, California, where it remains in operation today. Most of the old Skunk Works buildings in Burbank were demolished in the late 1990s to make room for parking lots. One main building still remains at 2777 Ontario Street in Burbank (near San Fernando Road), now used as an office building for digital film post-production and sound mixing. During the late 1990s when designing Pixar's building, Edwin Catmull and Steve Jobs visited a Skunk Works Building which influenced Jobs' design. In 2009, the Skunk Works was inducted into the International Air & Space Hall of Fame at the San Diego Air & Space Museum.

== Projects ==
=== 2015 projects ===
Next generation optionally-crewed U-2 aircraft. During September 2015 the proposed aircraft was deemed to have developed into more of a tactical reconnaissance aircraft, instead of strategic reconnaissance.

=== Aircraft ===
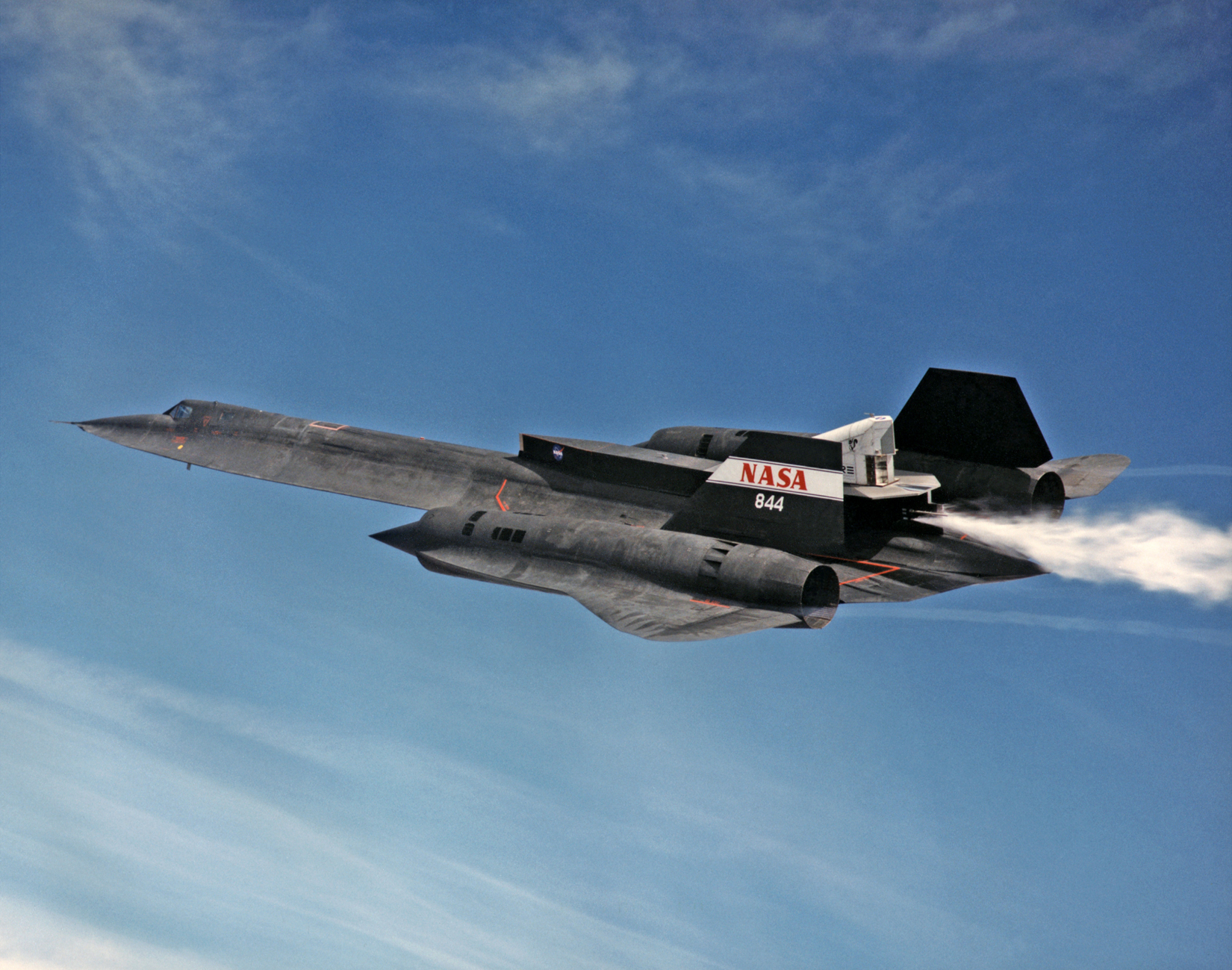
A modern Skunk Works project leverages an older one: LASRE atop the SR-71 Blackbird.

- Lockheed P-38 Lightning (unofficial)
- Lockheed P-80 Shooting Star
- Lockheed XF-90
- Lockheed F-104 Starfighter
- Lockheed U-2
- Lockheed X-26 Frigate
- Lockheed YO-3
- Lockheed A-12
- Lockheed SR-71 Blackbird
- Lockheed D-21
- Lockheed XST (Have Blue) and Lockheed F-117 Nighthawk
- Lockheed YF-22 and Lockheed Martin F-22 Raptor
- Lockheed Martin X-33
- Lockheed Martin X-35 and Lockheed Martin F-35 Lightning II
- Lockheed X-27
- Lockheed Martin Polecat
- Quiet Supersonic Transport
- Lockheed Martin Cormorant
- Lockheed Martin Desert Hawk
- Lockheed Martin RQ-170 Sentinel
- Lockheed Martin X-55
- Lockheed Martin SR-72
- Lockheed Martin X-59 QueSST
- Lockheed Martin Vectis

=== Other ===
- High beta fusion reactor
- Sea Shadow

== Term origin ==
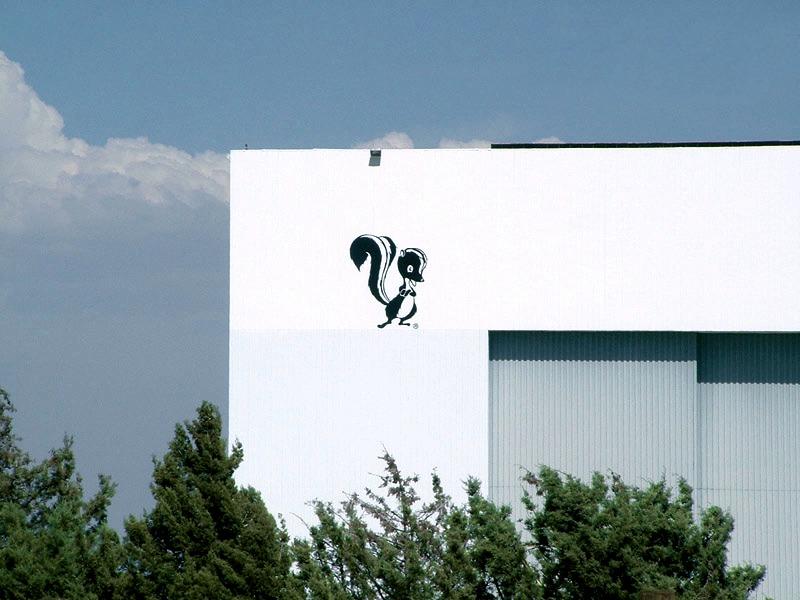
The Skunk Works logo as seen on one of Lockheed Martin’s hangars

The term "Skunk Works" came from Al Capp's satirical, hillbilly comic strip Li’l Abner, which was immensely popular from 1935 through the 1950s. In the comic, the "Skonk Works" was a dilapidated factory located on the remote outskirts of Dogpatch, in the backwoods of Kentucky. According to the strip, scores of locals were done in yearly by the toxic fumes of the concentrated "skonk oil", which was brewed and barreled daily by "Big Barnsmell" (known as the lonely "inside man" at the Skonk Works), by grinding dead skunks and worn shoes into a smoldering still, for some mysterious, unspecified purpose.

In mid-1939 when Lockheed was expanding rapidly, the YP-38 project was moved a few blocks away to the newly purchased 3G Distillery, also known as Three G or GGG Distillery. Lockheed took over the building but the sour smell of bourbon mash lingered, partly because the group of buildings continued to store barrels of aging whiskey. The first YP-38 was built there before the team moved back to Lockheed's main factory a year later. In 1964, Johnson told Look magazine that the bourbon distillery was the first of five Lockheed skunk works locations.

During the development of the P-80 Shooting Star, Johnson's engineering team was located adjacent to a malodorous plastics factory. According to Ben Rich’s memoir, an engineer jokingly showed up to work one day wearing a Civil Defense gas mask. To comment on the smell and the secrecy the project entailed, another engineer, Irv Culver, referred to the facility as "Skonk Works". As the development was very secret, the employees were told to be careful even with how they answered phone calls. One day, when the Department of the Navy was trying to reach the Lockheed management for the P-80 project, the call was accidentally transferred to Culver’s desk. Culver answered the phone in his trademark fashion of the time, by picking up the phone and stating "Skonk Works, inside man Culver". "What?" replied the voice at the other end. "Skonk Works", Culver repeated. The name stuck. Culver later said at an interview conducted in 1993 that "when Kelly Johnson heard about the incident, he promptly fired me. It didn’t really matter, since he was firing me about twice a day anyways."

At the request of the comic strip copyright holders, Lockheed changed the name of the advanced development company to "Skunk Works" in the 1960s. The name "Skunk Works" and the skunk design are now registered trademarks of the Lockheed Martin Corporation. The company also holds several registrations of it with the United States Patent and Trademark Office. They have filed several challenges against registrants of domain names containing variations on the term under anti-cybersquatting policies, and have lost a case under the .uk domain name dispute resolution service against a company selling cannabis seeds and paraphernalia, which used the word "skunkworks" in its domain name (referring to "Skunk", the pungent smell of the cannabis flower). Lockheed Martin claimed the company registered the domain in order to disrupt its business and that consumer confusion might result. The respondent company argued that Lockheed "used its size, resources and financial position to employ 'bullyboy' tactics against [...] a very small company."

In Australia, the trademark for use of the name "Skunkworks" is held by Perth-based The Novita Group Pty Ltd. Lockheed Martin formally registered opposition to the application in 2006, however the Australian government's intellectual property authority, IP Australia, rejected the opposition, awarding Novita the trademark in 2008.

== See also ==
- Advanced Propulsion Physics Laboratory
- Area 51
- Boeing Phantom Works
- Swamp Works

== Bibliography ==
- Bodie, Warren M. (2001). The Lockheed P-38 Lightning: The Definitive Story of Lockheed's P-38 Fighter. Hayesville, North Carolina: Widewing Publications. ISBN 0-9629359-5-6.
- Miller, Jay (1995). Lockheed Martin's Skunk Works: The Official History. Aerofax. ISBN 1-85780-037-0.
- Rich, Ben; Janos, Leo (1996). Skunk Works. Little, Brown & Company. ISBN 0-316-74300-3.
