= Lockheed Martin Vectis =

American stealth collaborative combat aircraft under development

General information
- Role: Unmanned military reconnaissance aircraft
- National origin: United States of America
- Manufacturer: Lockheed Martin Skunk Works
- Flights: 1 prototype under construction; 4 additional aircraft planned

History
- First flight: Planned for late 2027
- In service: Under development

The Lockheed Martin Vectis is an American stealth uncrewed collaborative combat aircraft (CCA) under development by Skunk Works, the advanced projects division of Lockheed Martin. The company revealed the aircraft in September 2025 as a single-engine, tailless design intended to operate either independently or as a teammate to crewed aircraft such as the F-35. Vectis belongs to Group 5 of the U.S. military's unmanned aircraft classification, the same category as the MQ-9 Reaper and the CCAs ordered by the United States Air Force.

Unlike the Air Force's first-increment CCAs, Vectis is not being built under a government contract. Lockheed Martin describes it as a clean-sheet, internally funded project. Construction of the first prototype is under way and the company is targeting a first flight by the end of 2027. In September 2026 Lockheed Martin announced four further aircraft, bringing the planned total to five.

The aircraft is roughly 34 ft (10.4 m) long with a wingspan of about 38 ft (11.6 m). Lockheed Martin has emphasized survivability, an affordable price relative to other CCAs, and an open systems architecture, and lists air-to-air, air-to-ground, electronic warfare and intelligence, surveillance, and reconnaissance among its intended roles.

== Development ==
=== Background ===
In 2022, Skunk Works publicly outlined a concept for teaming crewed and uncrewed aircraft that spanned several tiers of drones, from a cruise missile-like vehicle later called the Common Multi-Mission Truck up to a highly stealthy, autonomous flying wing. When the Air Force began its Collaborative Combat Aircraft program, Lockheed Martin entered a design in the first increment but was not selected. Skunk Works later said its proposal had been an expensive, very stealthy design that went beyond what the service wanted. The Air Force chose aircraft from General Atomics Aeronautical Systems and Anduril Industries, and announced in June 2026 that it would buy both, as the FQ-42A and FQ-44A respectively. Lockheed Martin was also not chosen for either the Air Force or Navy Next Generation Air Dominance fighter programs, although company executives have said the work done on its sixth-generation aircraft for that effort informs its current projects.

=== Unveiling ===
Lockheed Martin introduced Vectis in September 2025, ahead of the Air & Space Forces Association's Air, Space & Cyber Conference. OJ Sanchez, then vice president and general manager of Skunk Works, briefed reporters on September 16, and the company issued a press release on September 21. The company said development was already under way, that parts had been ordered, and that it aimed to design, build and fly the aircraft within two years.

Sanchez placed Vectis in size between the Common Multi-Mission Truck and an F-16, and said it was expected to keep pace with fifth-generation fighters, though the company's analysis did not point toward supersonic speed. He said Lockheed Martin had run classified analysis of crewed-uncrewed teaming that paired Vectis with the F-22 and F-35. An accompanying video showed a single F-22 directing four Vectis aircraft ahead of it. The company said the aircraft was not aimed at any single competition, but Sanchez called it a strong candidate for the Air Force's second CCA increment, and said it could be tailored for the Air Force, the Navy and international customers.

=== Engine selection and prototype construction ===
On December 18, 2025, Lockheed Martin announced that the Vectis prototype would be powered by a Williams International FJ44-4 turbofan, which produces more than 3,600 lbf (16 kN) of thrust. Peter McArdle, the program director at Skunk Works, said that using a mature engine would shorten the schedule.

The company has described a rapid development pace. According to Lockheed Martin, the team went from a first drawing to wind tunnel testing in under two months, completed its first digital build of the aircraft in six months, and released the first part for manufacture in eight months. The company has released photographs of prototype components, including a fuselage section and wing parts.

=== Expansion of the program ===
At a media roundtable on September 10, 2026, Skunk Works vice president and general manager Ron Fehlen said the first prototype remained on track to fly by the end of 2027 and that work had begun on four more aircraft. Lockheed Martin confirmed the expansion on September 14, when it also displayed a full-scale Vectis model for the first time at the Air, Space & Cyber Conference in National Harbor, Maryland. Fehlen described the decision as a strategic investment intended to speed up production and mature the design, and said the additional aircraft would be built and flown faster than the first, using production-quality manufacturing from the outset. He said conversations with domestic and international customers pointed to a need for a survivable, autonomous, multi-mission aircraft.

== Design ==
=== Airframe ===
Vectis is a single-engine, tailless aircraft with a lambda-shaped wing planform, a pronounced chine along the forward fuselage and a shovel-shaped nose. The War Zone described it as the first tailless CCA design from a U.S. manufacturer. Fehlen said the absence of a tail reduces drag and extends range, while also giving designers more freedom to shape the aircraft for low observability. Lockheed Martin has not published radar signature figures; Fehlen said only that the aircraft is designed to be survivable.

The engine is fed by a top-mounted intake that sits in a deep recess in the upper fuselage, behind a sloping V-shaped channel. Early renderings had shown a simpler inlet, and Fehlen said the recessed arrangement had been part of the design from the start but was not shown publicly at first. He said the placement reduces drag and, for operations from austere airfields, lowers the risk of the engine ingesting debris from the runway, a consideration linked to the Air Force's Agile Combat Employment concept. The War Zone noted that the inlet is not fully flush with the fuselage, as on the MQ-25 Stingray, but is close to it. The original 2025 promotional video also showed an S-shaped duct and a shrouded exhaust, both features associated with reduced signature.

Sanchez described Vectis as runway-based, with reliability and small-footprint maintenance built in to suit dispersed operations. He said it could be configured either as an aircraft flown regularly or as a boxed system that is assembled and flown when needed.

=== Mission systems and armament ===
Lockheed Martin has not announced a definitive weapons loadout. A promotional video released in September 2026 shows an internal weapons bay able to hold at least two munitions, and depicts the aircraft launching what appear to be AIM-120 AMRAAM air-to-air missiles and GBU-53/B StormBreaker glide bombs. The same video shows an electro-optical/infrared sensor turret mounted under the nose behind a faceted, low-observable cover. Fehlen said the aircraft is expected to handle both air-to-air and air-to-ground missions.

=== Autonomy and control ===
Vectis uses Lockheed Martin's MDCX autonomy and command-and-control system, which is also used with the U.S. Navy's MQ-25. The company says the aircraft is built around open architectures that align with U.S. government reference architectures for autonomy and mission systems, so that it can connect with platforms from other manufacturers. Fehlen said Lockheed Martin is drawing on autonomous air-intercept tests carried out with the Air Force on the X-62A test aircraft in 2026, and that specific autonomy and control requirements would be set by individual customers, with third-party vendors possible. The promotional video shows both control from a crewed aircraft and a conventional ground control station.

=== Manufacturing and cost ===
Lockheed Martin says Vectis was designed in a fully integrated digital environment and is being built with production processes rather than prototype-only methods. The airframe uses a technique the company calls minimal tooling determinant assembly, in which parts are designed to locate precisely against one another with little touch labor. Fehlen compared the approach to assembling flat-pack furniture and claimed labor-hour reductions of as much as 80 percent, along with a significantly reduced part count.

The company has said Vectis will be offered at a price in line with other CCAs but has not published a unit cost. For comparison, the Air Force's target for its first-increment CCAs is around $20 million per aircraft once full-rate production is reached. Fehlen distinguished Vectis from the more expendable "attritable" class of drones, which he said sit at a lower price and capability level than the CCAs the services are seeking.

== Specifications (Vectis prototype) ==
Data from

General characteristics

- Crew: None (uncrewed)
- Length: 34 ft (10 m) approximate
- Wingspan: 38 ft (12 m) approximate
- Powerplant: 1 × Williams FJ44-4 turbofan, 3,600 lbf (16 kN) thrust more than 3,600 lbf

Armament
Internal weapons bay (at least two munitions shown in company video)

== See also ==
Aircraft of comparable role, configuration, and era

- Anduril FQ-44 Fury
- Boeing MQ-28 Ghost Bat
- General Atomics FQ-42 Vengeance
- Kratos XQ-58 Valkyrie
- Northrop Grumman YFQ-48 Talon Blue
