= Reactionless drive =

Propulsion system creating motion without propellant

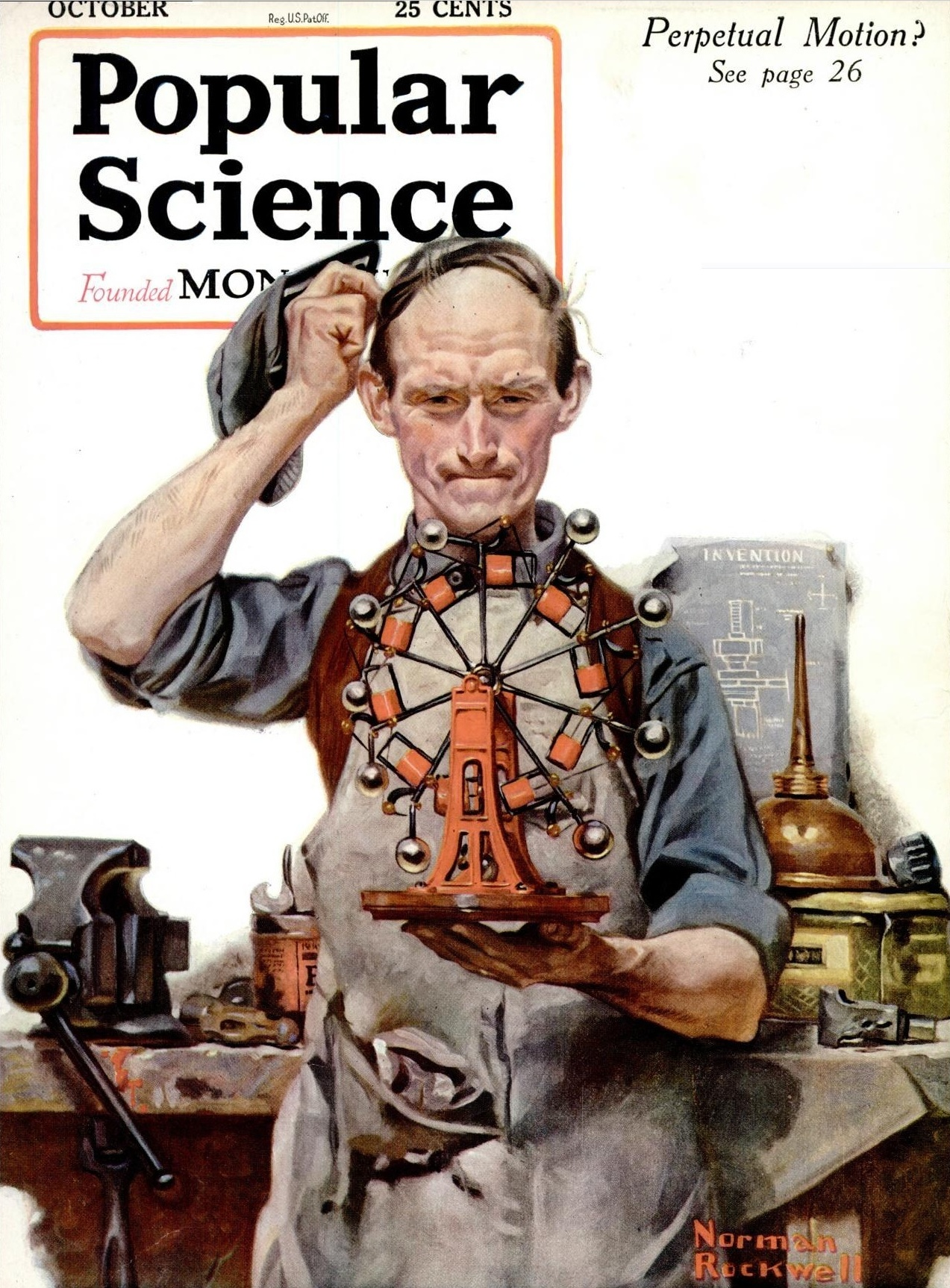
Reactionless drives have been compared to perpetual motion machines. The October 1920 issue of Popular Science covered the topic.

Reactionless drive refers to hypothetical and unproven forms of spacecraft propulsion that would generate thrust without the expelling of propellant or otherwise exchanging momentum. A propellantless drive is not necessarily reactionless if it functions as an open system interacting with external fields, but a reactionless drive is generally conceived as a self-contained or closed-system device, which is why such claims are commonly treated as conflicting with Newton's third law and the conservation of momentum. Reactionless-drive claims are therefore often compared to perpetual motion machines or other impossible-energy schemes if their reported performance is taken at face value.

The expression has been in English-language newspaper use since at least 1963 and later became a recurring public label for alleged no-propellant engines. Concepts described this way have included the Dean drive, electrogravitics and lifters, gyroscopic and oscillation devices, microwave-cavity thrusters such as the EmDrive and Cannae drive, the helical engine, Mach-effect or MEGA drives, quantum drive claims, and the quantum vacuum thruster.

No reactionless drive has become an accepted propulsion technology, and reported effects from devices such as a thrusting antenna and the EmDrive have later been described as null results, below photon-thrust limits, or experimental artifacts rather than evidence of new physics. Speculative discussion continues in propulsion and space drive literature, including proposals involving Mach-principle coupling, inertial frame manipulation, distant-matter interaction, Heim-theory propulsion, and zero-point field vacuum-inertia models.

== History and terminology ==
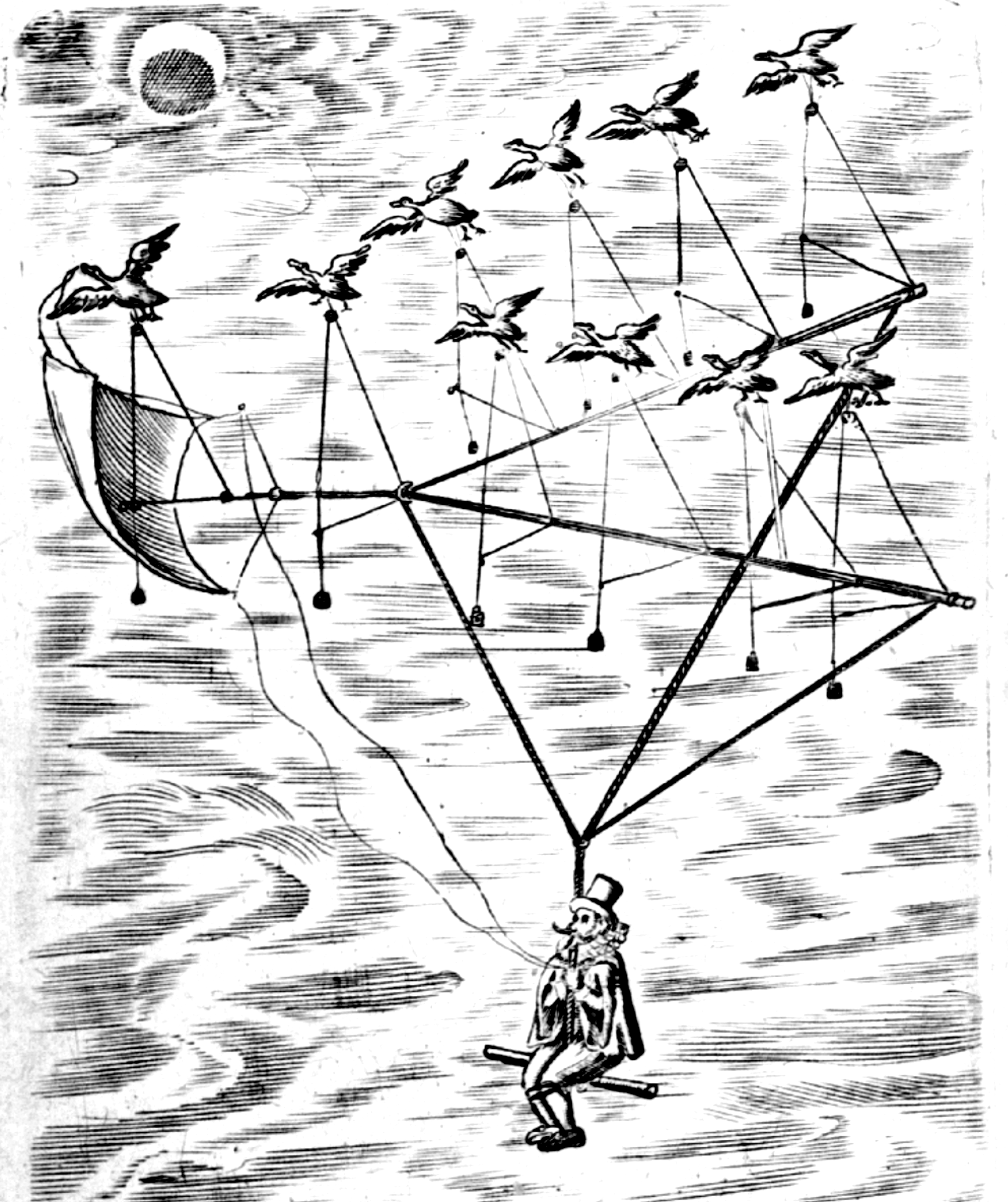
The frontispiece of the second edition of Francis Godwin's Man in the Moone, 1659.

In English-language popular writing, a reactionless drive is generally described as a hypothetical propulsion concept that would generate thrust without expelling propellant or reaction mass. These explanations usually define the term by contrast with ordinary rockets, which move by throwing exhaust out the back, whereas a reactionless drive would supposedly produce forward motion without that reaction mass exchange. The term has often been used for electrically powered or internally driven concepts said to convert stored energy directly into thrust, including microwave-cavity devices, inertial schemes, and other self-contained engine proposals. In this usage, the core claim is not merely low-propellant propulsion but propulsion without expelled mass, which is why these articles repeatedly tie the idea to Newton's third law and the conservation of momentum.

Several of these sources also describe reactionless-drive claims as bordering on perpetual-motion or free-energy arguments if the reported thrust and power figures were accepted at face value. Some writers have treated reactionless drives as a long-running science fiction trope as much as a technical claim, tying their appeal to the rocket equation and to the desire for a space engine that avoids the mass penalties of conventional rocketry. Winchell Chung, creator of the website Atomic Rockets that records the history of rocketry in science fiction, has described reactionless drives as hypothetical spacecraft drives that would move without propellant and, in a closed system, are impossible because they would violate conservation of momentum, and would radically alter the strategic logic of spaceflight by allowing even small spacecraft to function as relativistic weapons. Taken together, these sources use reactionless drive as a broad public-facing label for hypothetical self-contained propulsion claims, especially those said to generate thrust without propellant, rather than as the name of one single device or one settled academic field. (Note: In these sources, reactionless drive functions mainly as a broad public-facing label for hypothetical self-contained propulsion claims, especially in coverage of specific proposals such as the EmDrive, Cannae drive, David Burns's helical engine, and IVO's quantum drive, rather than as the name of a single device.)

The expression family was in newspaper use by at least 1963, when a California newspaper quoted inventor Allen Fisher referring to "My reactionless space drive" in describing a proposed propulsion device. A newspaper profile of Harry E. Holden in 1967 stated that he "holds a U.S. patent for his invention of a reactionless drive mechanism used in space vehicles." In 1980, a United Press International report on inventor Richard Foster described his proposed "space drive" as a "reactionless drive" in explaining his self-contained propulsion concept. By 1981, the term had also appeared in newspaper book coverage. An Iowa newspaper roundup described Joel Dickinson's The Death of Rocketry as presenting "a scientific explanation of the reactionless drive," and quoted the book's claim that "The reactionless drive would ... enable us to attain almost unlimited speeds in outer space."

Newspaper feature coverage through 1990 was using reactionless drive in straightforward descriptive prose: a Santa Maria Times article on inventor Bob Cook stated that "The reactionless drive utilizes circular motion to create a centrifugal force and, most importantly, focus it in one direction." Various other related technologies were proposed through the 20th century. In 1992, Rex L. Schlicher patented a "nonlinear electromagnetic propulsion system" described as creating a unidirectional propulsive force without particulate reaction mass. NASA's Glenn Research Center later tested Schlicher's "thrusting antenna", which had been claimed to produce thrust exceeding photon radiation pressure, and reported no correlated motion, concluding that any thrust was far below practically useful levels.

In the 21st century, the term by 2008 was already appearing in coverage of Roger Shawyer's EmDrive, which Universe Today described as a "reactionless propulsion system" and placed in a lineage of earlier reactionless-drive ideas dating back to the 1950s. The same wave of coverage also pulled in related microwave-cavity claims, including the Cannae drive, as part of a broader family of alleged no-propellant thrusters. During the mid-2010s, skeptical reporting on EmDrive tests helped make reactionless drive a recurring public label for these claims, even when the thrust signals were being interpreted as experimental error or artifact rather than evidence of new physics. The same term was being applied to David Burns's proposed helical engine, with explanatory pieces defining reactionless drives in general before using Burns's concept as the latest example. In the 2020s, popular coverage continued to use the label for other speculative concepts, including Jim Woodward's Mach-effect or MEGA drive and IVO's quantum drive. The term has also appeared by analogy in discussion of warp drive research, where weak-field or limited warp effects were compared to reactionless-drive proposals even while remaining conceptually distinct from them.

NASA engineers Marc G. Millis and Nicholas E. Thomas published Responding to Mechanical Antigravity, a paper based on the agency's Breakthrough Propulsion Physics project and its experience with large numbers of unsolicited breakthrough-propulsion proposals. The report summarized that these devices can give "the appearance that a net thrust is being produced without expelling a reaction mass or having a direct driving connection", which is why they can appear to be breakthrough propulsion concepts. They wrote that such submissions arrived at a rate of about one per workday.

=== Arts and culture ===
An illustration of a Star Trek "warp bubble".

Concepts related to or similar to reactionless drives have appeared across literature, film, and television, in many cases predating or paralleling the technical development of the technologies and theories described in this article. The Encyclopedia of Science Fiction traces fictional gravity counteraction from Francis Godwin's The Man in the Moone (1638), through George Tucker's A Voyage to the Moon (1827) and its antigravity metal "lunarium," to Percy Greg's coinage of "apergy" as an antigravity spacecraft propulsion force in Across the Zodiac (1880). The earliest of these treated the concept in quasi-scientific rather than purely magical terms.

As technical rocketry advanced in the early 20th century, pulp fiction kept pace with its own propulsion inventions. H. G. Wells's The First Men in the Moon (1901) popularized gravity shielding through "cavorite," a material used to construct a sphere capable of leaving Earth without expelling propellant. Similar ideas proliferated across the pulp era: Edgar Rice Burroughs's Barsoom series, beginning with A Princess of Mars (serialized 1912), described Martian airships propelled by a stored "eighth ray" used for lift and maneuvering rather than aerodynamic wings or rocket thrust, while Armageddon 2419 A.D. by Philip Francis Nowlan (1928) described "repellor anti-gravity rays" used as "legs" for airships, alongside "inertron," a substance that reacts to gravity opposite to normal matter. The Buck Rogers comic strip, launched in 1929, carried Nowlan's repulsor-beam and inertron concepts into the visual medium. The Encyclopedia of Science Fiction credited E. E. Smith's Spacehounds of IPC (1931) as containing the first use of the term "force field" in science fiction.

By mid-century, science fiction was moving beyond individual gadgets toward propulsion concepts with explicit theoretical rationales. The Encyclopedia of Science Fiction attributes early use of "space warp" and "hyperspace" terminology in the context of interstellar travel to John W. Campbell's Islands of Space (serialized 1931 in Amazing Stories Quarterly; published as a novel in 1957). James Blish's Cities in Flight series, beginning with "Bindlestiff" (December 1950, Astounding Science Fiction), introduced the "spindizzy," formally the Dillon-Wagoner Graviton Polarity Generator. The Encyclopedia of Science Fiction described the spindizzy as, in its day, "one of the best-loved items of sf Terminology," and noted that Blish gave the device a rationale rooted in theoretical physics, in which gravity fields are generated or cancelled by rotation owing to a fictional "Blackett-Dirac effect."

The National Air and Space Museum identified Forbidden Planet (1956) as the first film to depict a faster-than-light starship built by humans; Time (magazine) described the starship's propulsion as a "quanto-gravitetic hyperdrive," and the published screenplay text includes the same phrasing in its opening narration. Fiction magazines of this era also served as platforms for promoting claimed real-world propulsion devices. The Dean drive, a claimed reactionless device built by Norman L. Dean, received extensive promotion from John W. Campbell in Astounding Science Fiction beginning in 1960. Campbell published photographs of the device operating on a bathroom scale, and the June 1960 cover of Astounding featured a painting of a United States submarine near Mars supposedly propelled by a Dean drive.

In 1984, physicist Amit Goswami wrote that the Dean drive had become so embedded in genre consciousness that "it is now customary in SF circles to refer to a reactionless drive as a Dean drive." Cordwainer Smith's "The Lady Who Sailed The Soul" (Galaxy Science Fiction, April 1960) is among the earliest clearly sourced fictional treatments of photon-pressure sailing as a spacecraft propulsion method. The Visual Encyclopedia of Science Fiction catalogued antigravity, the Dean drive, inertialess drive, sails, and spindizzy as distinct propulsion categories for space travel in the genre.

The influence between fiction and propulsion research became most visible through television. Star Trek: The Original Series (premiered September 8, 1966) made "warp drive" and "tractor beam" household terms. Star Trek would later introduce a biologically mediated propulsion system with Star Trek: Discovery's spore drive, which uses a subspace fungal network for instantaneous travel. Physicist Miguel Alcubierre stated that his 1994 theoretical warp metric, a solution formulated within general relativity describing the expansion of spacetime behind and contraction in front of a theoretical spacecraft, was directly inspired by the terminology used in Star Trek; The Planetary Society described him as having developed the model "inspired by Star Trek."

== Types of related systems ==
A variety of drives directly characterized as, or functionally presented as reactionless drives, are listed here.

=== Dean drive ===
The Dean drive was a claimed reactionless device built by Norman L. Dean, who said that his working models functioned as a "reactionless thruster". The Dean drive received extensive promotion from John W. Campbell in Astounding Science Fiction beginning in 1960. Dean held several private demonstrations but never revealed the exact design of the models nor allowed independent analysis of them. Campbell published photographs of the device operating on a bathroom scale, and the June 1960 cover of Astounding featured a painting of a United States submarine near Mars supposedly propelled by a Dean drive. In 1984, physicist Amit Goswami wrote that the Dean drive had become so embedded in genre consciousness that "it is now customary in SF (science fiction) circles to refer to a reactionless drive as a Dean drive". The Visual Encyclopedia of Science Fiction catalogued the Dean drive as a distinct propulsion concept for space travel in the genre. Dean's claims of reactionless thrust generation were later argued to be mistaken, with the apparent "thrust" likely caused by friction between the device and the surface on which it rested rather than any effect that would operate in free space.

=== Electrogravitics and lifters ===
Electrogravitics began with Thomas Townsend Brown's 1920s experiments on a Coolidge tube, which Army Research Laboratory authors Thomas B. Bahder and Christian Fazi treated as the origin of the later Biefeld-Brown effect. In their account, Brown believed the energized tube produced thrust and sought British patent protection, receiving Patent 300,311 in 1928 for producing force or motion. Bahder and Fazi then traced a longer patent arc through Brown's U.S. Electrokinetic Apparatus patent in 1960, his Electrokinetic Transducer patent in 1962, and a further Electrokinetic Apparatus patent in 1965. Their appendix also noted parallel and later claimants, including A. H. Bahnson's electrical-thrust patents in 1960 and 1966 and two NASA asymmetric-capacitor patents in 2002, showing that the concept persisted as a continuing propulsion claim rather than a single episode in Brown's career. Reporting on ARL's own work, they said they had verified a net force on asymmetric capacitors of several shapes while also stressing that the physical basis of the effect remained unresolved.

Various historians placed Brown's devices in the realm of Asymmetrical Capacitor Thrusters, distinguishing rotating ACTs from vertical "lifters", comparing them with Alexander de Seversky's 1960s Ionocraft and Robert Talley's later vacuum tests. By 2003 The Guardian described skeletal high-voltage lifters as the closest thing to Brown's original vision, while Wired portrayed them as the work of grassroots antigravity subcultures trading designs online. Canning's report, published the next year, treated these machines not as forgotten curiosities but as active propulsion problem with a long history of interest and no proven mechanism. Millis's 2005 NASA review grouped "Biefeld-Brown effect," "lifters," "electrostatic antigravity," "electrogravitics," and "asymmetrical capacitors" as labels for the same family of high-voltage thrust claims.

=== Gyroscopic Inertial Thruster (GIT) ===
Gyroscopic thrust claims have typically centered on forcing a spinning gyroscope to precess in a way supposed to convert internal torques into a net linear force. In simpler terms, the claim was that the motion of a precessing gyroscope could be turned into one-way thrust. A 2006 NASA review of "mechanical antigravity" proposals treated Eric Laithwaite's gyroscope demonstrations as a famous example of this class of claim. Official material from the Royal Institution describes Laithwaite's 1974 lectures as controversial because he argued that the behavior of gyroscopes violated the law of conservation of energy.

Laithwaite patented, with William Dawson, a propulsion system in which gyroscopes mounted for remote-axis precession were claimed to move a vehicle through alternating precession-dominated and translation-dominated portions of motion. Later gyroscopic variants continued to make similar claims. Sandy Kidd's 1991 U.S. patent for a "gyroscopic apparatus" described a pair of opposed rotatable discs driven in different directions and periodically forced toward one another to generate a pulsatile force, with the claimed effect of producing upward thrust. In NASA's analysis, however, the apparent lift in such devices is not a true upward thrust but a torque acting through the pivots and stops of the mechanism. Millis and Thomas concluded that gyroscopic devices of this kind misinterpret torques as linear thrust, and distinguished them from reaction wheels, which can change a spacecraft's attitude but cannot change the position of the system's center of mass.

=== Helical engine ===
In 2019, NASA Marshall Space Flight Center engineer David M. Burns proposed the helical engine, a closed-loop ion-beam propulsion concept intended for long-term satellite station-keeping without refueling and for interstellar travel. Burns described it as an engine in which ions confined in a helical beam guide are accelerated to relativistic speeds and then decelerated to create unequal momentum exchange at the top and bottom of the engine. The proposed architecture used two concentric helical beam-guide cores, with ions traveling upward in an outer accelerating core and returning downward through an inner decelerating core.

Popular coverage described the idea as a particle-accelerator-based space drive that sought to avoid conventional propellant expenditure by exploiting relativistic changes in momentum inside a helical path. Burns stressed his concept required testing to prove it could produce thrust within real engineering constraints, and wrote that his Relativistic Momentum Transfer Model needed validation through tests of helical beam-guide shapes in a synchrotron. Secondary coverage treated the proposal cautiously. Newsweek, citing Burns and comments reported to New Scientist, described the basic concept as unproven. Universe Today described the paper as an outline rather than peer-reviewed work and treated the helical engine as a reactionless drive proposal akin to the EmDrive.

=== Mach effects and MEGA ===
James F. Woodward's Mach-effect propulsion program grew out of his long interest in using Mach's principle to pursue propellantless propulsion. By 1995, according to a later Wired profile, Woodward's ideas about Mach effects had coalesced into a full theory, and he turned to building a thruster based on stacks of piezoelectric disks that he believed could exploit tiny transient mass fluctuations. Earlier conference literature framed the work in propellantless-propulsion terms: Thomas L. Mahood's 1999 AIP conference paper was titled Propellantless propulsion: Recent experimental results exploiting transient mass modification, while a 2006 AIP paper by Paul March and Andrew Palfreyman described the Woodward effect as a transient mass fluctuation in energy-storing ions and reported experimental verification efforts at 2 to 4 MHz.

By 2020, the device was being referred to publicly as the Mach Effect Gravitational Assist, or MEGA, drive. Wired reported that Woodward and Hal Fearn secured NIAC funding in 2017 and used it to develop improved thrusters and the conceptual SSI Lambda interstellar probe. The same report described the device as an electricity-powered propulsion system designed to operate without propellant, while also noting mixed test results, the small scale of the reported forces, and the need for independent replication before the effect could be accepted.

=== Microwave cavity thrusters ===
Microwave cavity thrusters comprise a class of reactionless drive claims. In 2008, Universe Today described Roger Shawyer's EmDrive as a "reactionless propulsion system" that supposedly generated thrust by converting electrical energy via microwaves. Later coverage treated Guido Fetta's Cannae drive as a related device, describing both as closed microwave systems with no exhaust that purported to generate thrust. The subject drew wider attention after NASA Eagleworks tested radio-frequency cavity thrusters and later published a paper reporting small thrust measurements under vacuum conditions.

Coverage presented those results as extraordinary because, if valid, they would imply propulsion without expelled reaction mass and conflict with conservation of momentum. By 2018, however, some independent testing reported as pointing to ordinary experimental artifacts rather than new propulsion physics. National Geographic reported that tests by Martin Tajmar's group suggested the apparent thrust was due to electromagnetic interaction rather than the drive itself. Tajmar and colleagues later published an open-access study reporting no thrust across a wide frequency band and concluding that any anomalous thrust was below the photon-thrust limit, ruling out earlier reported values by at least two orders of magnitude.

=== Oscillation thrusters ===
Oscillation thrusters are mechanical devices claimed to create net thrust through cyclic motion of internal masses. NASA engineer Marc G. Millis and University of Miami researcher Nicholas E. Thomas described this family as "oscillation thrusters", also referred to as sticktion drives, internal drives, or slip-stick drives, and identified the 1959 Dean drive as one of its best-known examples. They wrote that, despite many variations, such devices generally rely on an asymmetric cycle in which internal masses move more quickly in one direction than the other, causing the whole apparatus to surge across the ground and give the appearance of thrust without expelled reaction mass. The idea persisted in patent literature for decades, from Dean's 1959 "System for Converting Rotary Motion into Unidirectional Motion" to Brandson R. Thornson's 1986 "Apparatus for Developing a Propulsion Force" and Richard E. Foster Sr.'s 1997 "Inertial Propulsion Plus/Device and Engine". Campbell's September 1960 "Report on the Dean Drive" presented Wellesley Engineering as having built a duplicate Dean model and several modified set-ups, all reported to have produced thrust.

The concept also acquired a broader magazine afterlife in Astounding and Analog: Campbell's June 1960 "The Space Drive Problem" treated the Dean drive as part of the search for non-rocket space propulsion, Analog put William O. Davis's "The Fourth Law of Motion" on its May 1962 cover as a science-fact breakthrough, and G. Harry Stine was still revisiting the "controversial Dean Drive" in a June 1976 retrospective. Foster's patent was especially explicit that later variants could require "external force assist" from friction wheels, air blast, jets, rockets, or force derived from the pathway to prevent the craft from returning to its prior position during the return stroke. Millis and Thomas concluded that oscillation thrusters are not self-contained propulsion devices but misinterpretations of differential friction, with the ground serving as the reaction mass, and later analytical work on Dean-drive mechanics likewise treated the system as open once ground forces are induced and any unidirectional motion as limited and friction-dependent rather than sustained self-contained propulsion.

=== Quantum drives ===
A number of named no-propellant drive claims, including devices presented as quantum drives or related reactionless engines, have been proposed. Notable "quantum drive" claims have centered on IVO Ltd.'s Quantum Drive, which the company introduced in 2022 as a claimed "pure electric thruster" using zero fuel and which the University of Plymouth linked to Mike McCulloch's theory of quantized inertia. Independent coverage in 2023 described the device as a controversial or "impossible" propulsion claim that purported to generate thrust without propellant and framed the planned orbital test as a decisive moment for the concept. The proposed flight test was tied to IVO's Barry-1 CubeSat satellite mission, which multiple outlets described as an attempt to determine whether the Quantum Drive could produce measurable thrust in orbit under operating conditions.

In early 2024, however, Futurism reported that contact had been lost with the spacecraft before the drive could be tested, leaving the concept without a completed in-space demonstration. Coverage of the Quantum Drive also consistently presented it as a disputed reactionless or no-propellant drive claim rather than an accepted propulsion technology. Universe Today noted that many physicists regarded the underlying theory as fringe, while Popular Mechanics, Forbes, and Futurism all stressed that the device was being promoted as something that would defy ordinary expectations about propellant-based spaceflight or Newtonian mechanics.

=== Quantum vacuum thruster ===
The Q-thruster, or Quantum Vacuum Plasma Thruster, was a proposed propulsion concept associated with Harold G. White's Eagleworks Laboratories program (also called the Advanced Propulsion Physics Laboratory) at NASA's Johnson Space Center. In a 2011 Eagleworks presentation, White and his coauthors said the laboratory would commission its torsion pendulum with an existing Quantum Vacuum Plasma Thruster and described earlier QVPT work as suggesting very high specific impulse and specific force, with speculative applications ranging from human Mars missions to one-year Neptune transits at higher power levels. In a 2013 NASA brief, White described Q-thrusters as a low-technology readiness level (TRL) form of electric propulsion that would "push off of the quantum vacuum" using magnetohydrodynamics, treating the vacuum as a sea of virtual particles, and argued that recent model development and test data suggested performance competitive for in-space propulsion.

NASA project summaries in 2014 for the Q-Thruster Breadboard Campaign said three FY13 test campaigns had produced measurable thrust, raising the concept from TRL 2 to early TRL 3, and described the technology as a mission-enabling form of electric propulsion with about seven times the thrust-to-power ratio of Hall thrusters and a target of 0.4 N/kW at maturity. B. Kent Joosten and White in a 2015 IEEE mission-analysis paper described the Q-thruster as a system that uses quantum vacuum fluctuations as its "propellant" source, eliminating the need for conventional on-board propellant, and modeled round-trip Mars missions, rapid Jupiter and Saturn transfers, and interstellar performance under those assumptions. In 2016, H. Fearn and James F. Woodward treated White's quantum-vacuum-plasma interpretation as part of the broader breakthrough-propulsion literature, but argued that the proposal led to incorrect results and noted that they had not found the underlying Q-thruster physics written up in any detailed peer-reviewed paper.

== Space-drive theory ==
In propulsion literature, "space drive" has been used as a broad term for hypothetical self-contained propulsion in which a vehicle would move by interacting with its surrounding space rather than by expelling propellant. Marc G. Millis described it as a generic term encompassing attempts to induce motion through vehicle-space interactions, with the motivating goal of eliminating the need for propellant. Earlier work by Millis treated the idea as a way to frame the unresolved momentum-conservation and inertial-reference problems that any propellantless drive would have to solve.

=== Mach-principle coupling ===
One speculative route within space-drive theory has been to revisit Mach's principle, the idea that inertial frames arise from the distribution of surrounding matter. In 1996, Millis wrote that a propulsion-useful formalism of Mach's principle would need to show how reaction forces could be transmitted to surrounding matter, so that "pushing against that frame with a space drive is actually pushing against the distant surrounding matter". In a 2005 review he again described reexamining Mach's principle as one theoretical approach to momentum conservation for space drives, noting that such Machian perspectives treated inertial frames as connected to the surrounding mass in the universe.

=== Inertial frame manipulation ===
A related but somewhat narrower line of thought has been to ask whether propulsion might be obtained by altering the properties of inertial frames themselves. In the same 1996 paper, Millis suggested that if asymmetries could somehow be created in the spacetime properties that give rise to inertial frames, they might produce net inertial forces. He returned to that possibility in 2017 in a paper devoted to inertial frames, treating variable inertial-frame strength as a speculative "what-if" framework for space-drive thought experiments rather than as an established theory.

=== Distant-matter interaction ===
These Machian and inertial-frame ideas overlapped in proposals that a hypothetical drive might somehow exchange momentum with distant matter rather than with onboard reaction mass. Millis's 1996 discussion explicitly framed the problem in those terms, while his 2017 paper recast older direct-interaction versions of Mach's principle as part of a broader attempt to understand whether surrounding matter might endow space with inertial-frame properties that a drive could interact with.

=== Heim-theory propulsion ===
Another speculative route in breakthrough-propulsion literature drew on Burkhard Heim's Heim theory, a higher-dimensional field theory that Walter Dröscher and Jochem Häuser said implied two additional interactions beyond the known fundamental forces. In their account, one of these, the "graviphoton force", would permit a distinct "gravitophoton field propulsion" scheme that could accelerate a material body without propellant. Later propulsion overviews likewise listed Heim's quantized space-time ideas among speculative alternatives being considered alongside vacuum-energy and Machian approaches.

=== Vacuum-inertia models ===
Another speculative route in space-drive theory linked inertia, and in some versions gravitation, to interactions with the electromagnetic zero-point field. In The Challenge to Create the Space Drive, Millis treated the electromagnetic fluctuations of the vacuum, or ZPF, as a promising candidate medium for hypothetical space-drive research, noting that discovering any way to react asymmetrically with the ZPF would likely create a space drive. Bernard Haisch and Alfonso Rueda's NASA workshop paper likewise described the zero-point field as the basis of inertia and gravitation and treated the concept as relevant to radically new propulsion schemes. Millis cautioned, however, that such theories had not been developed in the context of propulsion and did not directly show how inertia or gravity might be manipulated for thrust.

== Selected claims, tests, and proposals ==
The following table summarizes selected reactionless-drive systems and related proposals discussed in this article, including claimed demonstrations, laboratory tests, and later assessments.

Claimed and proposed reactionless drive systems
System / concept	Domain	First claimed or tested usage	Date	Device / claimant	Status	Remarks
Electrogravitics / lifters	Ground	Brown Coolidge-tube experiments; British Patent 300,311	1928	Thomas Townsend Brown	Unverified	Bahder & Fazi (ARL, 2003) verified net force on asymmetric capacitors but physical basis unresolved. Millis (2005) grouped Biefeld-Brown, lifters, and electrogravitics as one family of high-voltage thrust claims.
Dean drive	Ground	Private demonstrations on bathroom scale; no independent analysis permitted	1959	Norman L. Dean (US Patent 2886976)	Unverified	Promoted by John W. Campbell in Astounding beginning 1960. Goswami (1985): "it is now customary in SF circles to refer to a reactionless drive as a Dean drive." Apparent thrust later attributed to friction.
Oscillation thrusters	Ground	Dean drive (1959) identified as best-known example; variants through Foster patent (1997)	1959	Dean; Thornson; Foster	Unverified	Millis & Thomas (2006): asymmetric internal-mass cycles; ground serves as reaction mass. Provatidis (2013): motion friction-dependent, not sustained self-contained propulsion.
Gyroscopic Inertial Thruster	Ground	Eric Laithwaite 1974 Royal Institution lectures	1974	Laithwaite; Sandy Kidd (US Patent 5024112, 1991)	Unverified	Royal Institution describes Laithwaite's lectures as controversial. Millis & Thomas (2006): apparent lift is torque through pivots and stops, not true thrust.
Thrusting antenna (Schlicher)	Ground	Patented nonlinear electromagnetic propulsion; claimed thrust exceeding photon pressure	1992	Rex L. Schlicher (US Patent 5142861)	Null result	NASA Glenn tested device; reported no correlated motion; thrust far below practically useful levels.
Mach-effect / MEGA drive	Ground	Piezoelectric-disk thrusters exploiting claimed transient mass fluctuations	1995	James F. Woodward	Unverified	Secured NIAC funding 2017; SSI Lambda interstellar probe concept developed. Mixed test results; small reported forces; independent replication needed.
EmDrive (microwave cavity)	Ground	Claimed thrust from closed microwave cavity	~2001	Roger Shawyer	Null result	NASA Eagleworks reported small thrust under vacuum. Tajmar et al. (2022): no thrust across wide frequency band; any anomalous signal below photon-thrust limit by at least two orders of magnitude.
Quantum vacuum thruster (Q-thruster)	Ground	Eagleworks lab torsion pendulum tests; claimed TRL 2→3	2011	Harold G. White / NASA Eagleworks (JSC)	Unverified	White (2013): proposed to "push off of the quantum vacuum" via MHD. Fearn & Woodward (2016) critiqued Q-thruster physics; noted no detailed peer-reviewed paper found.
Cannae drive	Ground	Related microwave-cavity device; closed system purporting to generate thrust without exhaust	~2014	Guido Fetta	Unverified	Described alongside EmDrive as part of a broader family of alleged no-propellant microwave cavity claims.
Helical engine	Theoretical	Proposed closed-loop relativistic ion-beam concept	2019	David M. Burns (NASA MSFC)	Proposed	AIAA conference paper; Burns stated synchrotron validation needed. Secondary coverage treated as reactionless drive proposal akin to EmDrive.
Quantum Drive (IVO)	Space (planned)	Claimed "pure electric thruster" using zero fuel; linked to quantized inertia theory	2022	IVO Ltd / Barry-1 CubeSat	Unverified (contact lost)	University of Plymouth linked device to McCulloch's quantized inertia theory. Contact lost with spacecraft before drive could be tested.
Mach-principle coupling	Theoretical	Speculative framework: reaction forces transmitted to distant matter	–	–	Theoretical	Millis (1996): propulsion-useful Mach formalism would need to show how reaction forces transmit to surrounding matter.
Inertial frame manipulation	Theoretical	Speculative: asymmetries in spacetime inertial-frame properties might produce net forces	–	–	Theoretical	Millis (2017): variable inertial-frame strength treated as "what-if" framework for thought experiments, not established theory.
Heim-theory propulsion	Theoretical	Higher-dimensional field theory implying "graviphoton force" for propellantless acceleration	–	–	Theoretical	Dröscher & Häuser (2005): two additional interactions beyond known forces, one permitting propellantless acceleration. Listed among speculative alternatives in later propulsion overviews.
Vacuum-inertia models (ZPF)	Theoretical	Speculative: inertia linked to electromagnetic zero-point field; asymmetric ZPF reaction as space drive	–	–	Theoretical	Millis (1996): ZPF as promising candidate medium; not yet developed in propulsion context. Haisch & Rueda (1999): ZPF as basis of inertia and gravitation.

== See also ==
- Bussard ramjet – Proposed spacecraft propulsion method
- Emerging technologies – Technology still to be fully developed
- History of aviation
- History of rockets
- History of spaceflight
- New Millennium Program – NASA projects to test new space technologies
- Non-rocket spacelaunch – Concepts for launch into space
- Stochastic electrodynamics – Variation of classical electrodynamics
- Spacecraft electric propulsion – Type of spacecraft propulsion using electrical energy to accelerate propellant
- Timeline of aviation
- Timeline of rocket and missile technology
- Timeline of spaceflight
