= Helical engine =

Proposed spacecraft that violates the laws of physics

The helical engine is a proposed reactionless drive for spacecraft propulsion that violates the laws of physics by not using propellant. It was proposed by David M. Burns, a former NASA engineer at the Marshall Space Flight Center in Alabama. In a non-peer-reviewed report published on a NASA server in 2019, Burns claimed that his concept engine had a “nearly infinite” specific impulse. The helical engine uses a particle accelerator to increase and decrease the relativistic mass of particles using the theory of relativity to create a push forward that accelerates a spacecraft.

Unlike traditional rocket thrusters, a helical engine would not be required to expend any propellant, meaning it would not run out of fuel as long as it had access to power. If it worked, it would be useful for long-duration space missions, such as holding satellites in precise orbits. If functional, the helical engine could theoretically accelerate a spacecraft close to the speed of light. There have been other reactionless drives proposed; however, none have been successfully proven. There is significant doubt in the scientific community on whether such drives are possible.

== Proposed mechanism ==
Diagram of the helical engine's fundamental design, ions travel along the arrows in a closed loop

Traditional rocket engines rely on Newton's Third law of motion to generate thrust. They burn fuel with an oxygen source in a combustion chamber, creating a hot exhaust that is propelled through a nozzle and pushes the rocket forward.

Unlike conventional rockets, the helical engine is reactionless and theoretically produces a forward acceleration without expelling matter. Burns hypothesized that this could be done with a helical particle accelerator, which would alternately accelerate and decelerate particles traveling at near light-speed along the ship in a closed, helical loop. The particles travel fastest at the front of the ship and slowest at the back; thus, the particles at the front have the highest kinetic energy.

Einstein’s mass-energy equivalence states that these particles must also have the largest equivalent mass since they have the most energy. Similarly, because the ions at the back of the ship are at their lowest kinetic energy, they have the lowest mass. Since the ions are in a closed loop, the heavier ions have a greater change in momentum when reversing directions compared to the lighter ions in the back. Therefore, it is proposed that the momentum transferred to the ship is slightly stronger in the forward direction than backwards, accelerating the ship forward.

== Theoretical limitations ==
The helical engine is a hypothetical design that has only been run in a preliminary simulation. Scientists, and even its creator, David Burns, are skeptical of it since its mathematical foundation is not proven. If the design works, it would violate the law of conservation of momentum, as it accelerates the ship and its ions in one direction without pushing another object in the opposite direction.

Critics have also pointed out a flaw in Burns’ mathematical calculations. They claim that because the particles’ mass changes with their speed due to relativity, their higher rotational speed at the front of the ship increases their mass, which then decreases their speed along the ship's axis. Thus, the particles would actually apply equal forces on each side of the ship, ultimately cancelling each other out and producing no overall acceleration.

Even if it were to work, the simulation estimates a thrust of around 1 Newton, approximately the weight of 102 grams on Earth. The engine would need a very large power source to accelerate the ship, since it requires 165 MW of power to produce the 1 Newton of thrust.

== Other reactionless drives ==
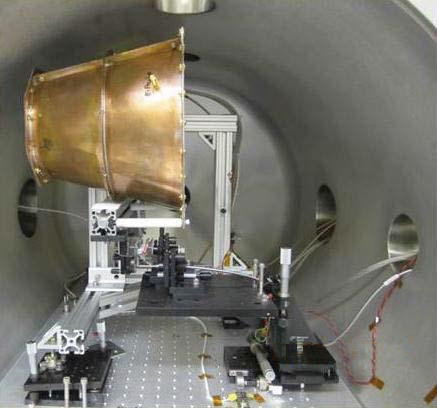
NASA prototype of the EmDrive

There have been proposals of methods to generate thrust without expelling mass. In 2016, NASA experimented with a metal chamber called the EmDrive that they hoped could create thrust without propellant. The EmDrive was tested, but the thrust recorded was determined to be just effects from Earth’s magnetic field. The company IVO has also developed a propellantless propulsion system called the Quantum Drive that theoretically uses electricity to generate thrust. There have been two attempted orbital tests of the Quantum Drive, but neither was successful.
