= James Woodward (physicist) =

American physicist (1941–2025)

James F. Woodward (1941 – August 9, 2025) was an American physicist who was professor emeritus of history and an adjunct professor of physics at California State University, Fullerton. He is best known for a physics hypothesis that he proposed in 1990, later expanded, that predicts several physical effects that he refers to as 'Mach effects'. Woodward claimed the effect could be used as a reactionless drive for space travel.

== Education and professorships ==
- A.B., Middlebury College, 1964, Physics
- M.S., New York University, 1969, Physics
- Ph.D., University of Denver, 1972, History of science

Woodward was a professor emeritus of history and an adjunct professor of physics at California State University, Fullerton.

== Mach effects ==
Woodward claimed that his hypothesis predicts physical forces that he calls Mach effects but are also referred to as the Woodward effect. He said that his hypothesis was based on Mach's principle that posits inertia, the resistance of mass to acceleration, is a result of the mutual gravitational attraction of all matter in the universe. Thus, if the mass of a given object can be varied while being oscillated in a linear or orbital path, such that the mass is high while the mass is moving in one direction and low while moving back, then the net effect should be acceleration in one direction as the inertial drag of the universe upon the object varies as its mass varies. If a spacecraft engine could be designed to exploit it then acceleration could be produced without using rocket propellants. The effect is controversial because within mainstream physics the underlying model proposed for it appears to be faulty, resulting in violations of energy conservation as well as momentum conservation. Woodward and his associates have claimed since the 1990s to have successfully measured forces at levels great enough for practical use and also claim to be working on the development of a practical prototype thruster. No practical working devices have been publicly demonstrated, and other experiments have failed to corroborate these claims.

James F. Woodward's Mach-effect propulsion program grew out of his long interest in using Mach's principle to pursue propellantless propulsion. By 1995, according to a later Wired profile, Woodward's ideas about Mach effects had coalesced into a full theory, and he turned to building a thruster based on stacks of piezoelectric disks that he believed could exploit tiny transient mass fluctuations. Earlier conference literature framed the work in propellantless-propulsion terms: Thomas L. Mahood's 1999 AIP conference paper was titled Propellantless propulsion: Recent experimental results exploiting transient mass modification, while a 2006 AIP paper by Paul March and Andrew Palfreyman described the Woodward effect as a transient mass fluctuation in energy-storing ions and reported experimental verification efforts at 2 to 4 MHz.

By 2020, the device was being referred to publicly as the Mach Effect Gravitational Assist, or MEGA, drive. Wired reported that Woodward and Hal Fearn secured NIAC funding in 2017 and used it to develop improved thrusters and the conceptual SSI Lambda interstellar probe. The same report described the device as an electricity-powered propulsion system designed to operate without propellant, while also noting mixed test results, the small scale of the reported forces, and the need for independent replication before the effect could be accepted.

== Speculation on space travel ==
He frequently contributed to articles on speculative space travel subjects, especially wormholes. In 2012, he published a book on the application of the physical effects predicted by his hypothesis to space travel.

== Personal life ==
Woodward died on August 9, 2025 at the age of 84.
