= Quantum inequalities =

Constraints on energy distribution in spacetime

Quantum inequalities are local constraints on the magnitude and extent of distributions of negative energy density in space-time. Initially conceived to clear up a long-standing problem in quantum field theory (namely, the potential for unconstrained negative energy density at a point), quantum inequalities have proven to have a diverse range of applications.

The form of the quantum inequalities is reminiscent of the uncertainty principle.

== Energy conditions in classical field theory ==
Einstein's theory of General Relativity amounts to a description of the relationship between the curvature of space-time, on the one hand, and the distribution of matter throughout space-time on the other. This precise details of this relationship are determined by the Einstein equations

$G_{\mu\nu}=\kappa T_{\mu\nu}$.

Here, the Einstein tensor $G_{\mu\nu}$ describes the curvature of space-time, whilst the energy–momentum tensor $T_{\mu\nu}$ describes the local distribution of matter. ($\kappa$ is a constant.) The Einstein equations express local relationships between the quantities involved—specifically, this is a system of coupled non-linear second order partial differential equations.

A very simple observation can be made at this point: the zero-point of energy-momentum is not arbitrary. Adding a "constant" to the right-hand side of the Einstein equations will effect a change in the Einstein tensor, and thus also in the curvature properties of space-time.

All known classical matter fields obey certain "energy conditions". The most famous classical energy condition is the "weak energy condition"; this asserts that the local energy density, as measured by an observer moving along a time-like world line, is non-negative. The weak energy condition is essential for many of the most important and powerful results of classical relativity theory—in particular, the singularity theorems of Hawking et al. Hawking radiation suggests that black holes emit thermal energy due to quantum effects, even though nothing escapes their event horizon directly. This process aligns with quantum inequalities, which set strict limits on how much energy can appear or disappear in a given space. These inequalities ensure that Hawking radiation remains consistent with the laws of physics, reinforcing the reality of both phenomena and their connection in extreme spacetime conditions. In addition, we have The Penrose inequality which is a rule that says the mass (or energy) of a black hole is related to the size of its event horizon (the boundary beyond which nothing can escape). This idea supports "cosmic censorship," which is the idea that we can never directly see a "naked" singularity (a point of infinite density inside a black hole).

In the quantum world, which deals with very small particles, this rule gets expanded to include something called "entropy." Entropy is a way to measure how disordered or chaotic a system is. The idea is that the total entropy (or disorder) of a system, including both the black hole and the quantum matter around it, should never decrease. This idea helps ensure that the laws of physics stay consistent, even in the strange world of quantum mechanics.

== Energy conditions in quantum field theory ==
The situation in quantum field theory is rather different: the expectation value of the energy density can be negative at any given point. In fact, things are even worse: by tuning the state of the quantum matter field, the expectation value of the local energy density can be made arbitrarily negative.

== Inequalities ==
The general form of worldline Quantum Inequality is the following equation. There are many variations towards quantum inequalities but this where all are derived from.

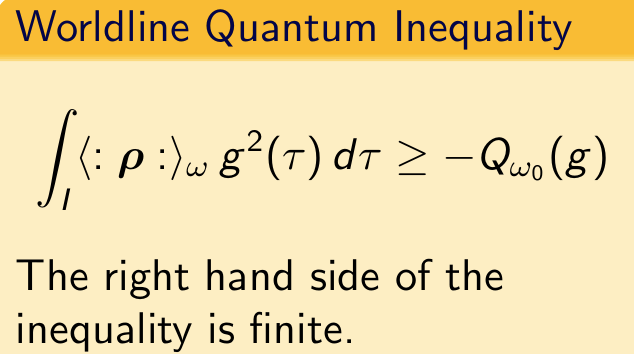
Worldline Quantum Inequality

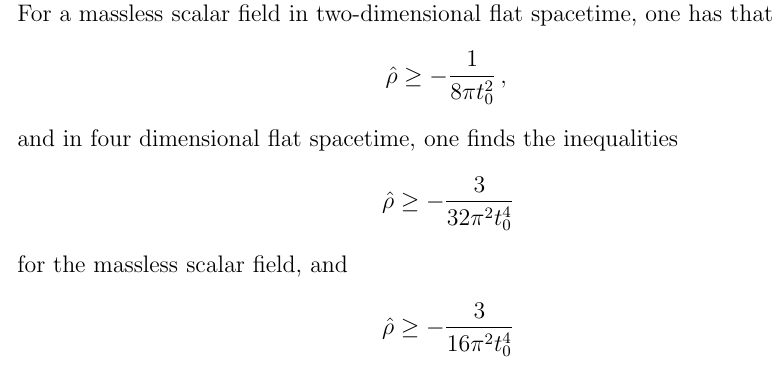
energy density in quantum inequalities

For free, massless, minimally coupled scalar fields, for all $\tau_0>0$ the following inequality holds along any inertial observer worldline with velocity $u^i$ and proper time $\tau$:

$$\frac{\tau_0}{\pi}\int_{-\infty}^{\infty}\frac{ \langle T_{ij}u^iu^j\rangle d\tau}{\tau^2+\tau^2_0} \geq -\frac{3}{32\pi^2\tau_0^4}.$$

This implies the averaged weak energy condition as $\tau_0 \rightarrow \infty$, but also places stricter bounds on the length of episodes of negative energy.

Similar bounds can be constructed for massive scalar or electromagnetic fields. Related theorems imply that pulses of negative energy need to be compensated by a larger positive pulse (with magnitude growing with increasing pulse separation).

Note that the inequality above only applies to inertial observers: for accelerated observers weaker or no bounds entail.

== Applications ==
Distributions of negative energy density comprise what is often referred to as exotic matter, and allow for several intriguing possibilities: for example, the Alcubierre drive potentially allows for faster-than-light space travel.

Quantum inequalities constrain the magnitude and space-time extent of negative energy densities. In the case of the Alcubierre warp drive mentioned above, the quantum inequalities predict that the amount of exotic matter required to create and sustain the warp drive "bubble" far exceeds the total mass-energy of the universe.

== History ==
The earliest investigations into quantum inequalities were carried out by Larry Ford and Tom Roman; an early collaborator was Mitchael Pfenning, one of Ford's students at Tufts University. Michael J. Pfenning's work on quantum inequalities showed that in a 2-D spacetime (Minkowski and Rindler) , the energy of the electromagnetic field behaves similarly to scalar fields due to the flat nature of spacetime. The difference is the electromagnetic field has two polarization states. However, in a 4-D curved spacetime (like Einstein's universe), the fields behave differently, resulting in distinct quantum inequalities for each. This produces two separate equations for the electromagnetic and scalar fields Important work was also carried out by Eanna Flanagan. Flanagan's work expands on Vollick's findings, which help explain how energy behaves in certain types of spacetimes. This study specifically examines the energy of a free, massless particle within a two-dimensional space, which doesn't directly apply to the three-dimensional space we experience in our world. More recently, Chris Fewster (of the University of York, England) has applied rigorous mathematics to produce a variety of quite general quantum inequalities. Specific examples are for the free scalar field are computed. Additionally, QEIs are also developed for a specific type of quantum field theory called unitary, positive energy conformal field theories in two dimensions of space and time. In this setting, it's possible to calculate the probability of getting different results when measuring certain "smears" (or averages) of the stress-energy tensor, which represents the distribution of energy and momentum in space and time, when the system is in its lowest energy state (the vacuum state). Reiner Verch's work explores the role of quantum inequalities (QIs) in understanding the behavior of energy and particles in both quantum field theory and quantum mechanics. One key concept is the "backflow phenomenon," where particles appear to flow backward in certain situations, although this is governed by specific limits. Verch also examines Weyl quantization, which relates to the uncertainty principle, suggesting that it is impossible to fully determine both the position and momentum of a particle simultaneously. His research further highlights that, despite appearances, quantum systems exhibit underlying stability, reinforcing fundamental principles of quantum mechanics, including the uncertainty principle and dynamical stability. Stefan Hollands' work focuses on Quantum Energy Inequalities (QEIs), which are rules in physics that limit how much "negative energy" can appear in certain areas of space and time. He studies these limits for a specific type of theory called conformal field theories (CFTs), which are mathematical models used to describe particles and forces in a two-dimensional flat universe (Minkowski space).

The QEIs depend on two key things:

1. A weight function, which is like a mathematical tool to focus on specific areas.
2. The central charges of the theory, numbers that describe how complex the theory is.

Importantly, these limits do not depend on the specific state of the system, meaning they apply universally. Hollands shows how these rules work for different situations: when measuring energy along paths slower than light (timelike), at the speed of light (null) and across regions of space (spacelike), as well as over entire areas of spacetime.

The takeaway is that these rules prevent too much negative energy from appearing in one spot, ensuring the theory stays consistent with fundamental principles like causality—the idea that causes happen before effects. This helps scientists understand how energy behaves in complex quantum systems.
