= Faster-than-light =

Propagation of information or matter faster than the speed of light

Because the sphere travels faster than light, the observer sees nothing until it has already passed. Then, two images appear: one of the sphere arriving (on the right) and one of it departing (on the left).

Faster-than-light (superluminal or supercausal) travel and communication are the hypothetical propagation of matter or information faster than the speed of light in vacuum (c). The special theory of relativity implies that only particles with zero rest mass (i.e., photons) may travel at the speed of light, and that nothing may travel faster.

Particles whose speed exceeds that of light (tachyons) have been hypothesized, but their existence would violate causality and would imply time travel. The scientific consensus is that they do not exist.

According to all observations and current scientific theories, matter travels at slower-than-light (subluminal) speed with respect to the locally distorted spacetime region. Speculative faster-than-light concepts include the Alcubierre drive, Krasnikov tubes, traversable wormholes, and quantum tunneling. Some of these proposals find loopholes around general relativity, such as by expanding or contracting space to make the object appear to be travelling greater than c. Such proposals are still widely believed to be impossible as they still violate current understandings of causality, and they all require fanciful mechanisms to work (such as requiring exotic matter).

== Superluminal travel of non-information ==
In the context of this article, "faster-than-light" means the transmission of information or matter faster than c, a constant equal to the speed of light in vacuum, which is 299,792,458 m/s (by definition of the metre) or about 186,282.397 miles per second. This is not quite the same as traveling faster than light, since:

- Some processes propagate faster than c, but cannot carry information (see examples in the sections immediately following).
- In some materials where light travels at speed c/n (where n is the refractive index) other particles can travel faster than c/n (but still slower than c), leading to Cherenkov radiation (see phase velocity below).

Neither of these phenomena violates special relativity or creates problems with causality, and thus neither qualifies as faster-than-light as described here.

In the following examples, certain influences may appear to travel faster than light, but they do not convey energy or information faster than light, so they do not violate special relativity.

=== Daily sky motion ===
For an earth-bound observer, objects in the sky complete one revolution around the Earth in one day. Proxima Centauri, the nearest star outside the Solar System, is about four and a half light-years away. In this frame of reference, in which Proxima Centauri is perceived to be moving in a circular trajectory with a radius of four light years, it could be described as having a speed many times greater than c as the rim speed of an object moving in a circle is a product of the radius and angular speed. It is also possible on a geostatic view, for objects such as comets to vary their speed from subluminal to superluminal and vice versa, simply because the distance from the Earth varies. Comets may have orbits which take them out to more than 1000 AU. The circumference of a circle with a radius of 1000 AU is greater than one light day. In other words, a comet at such a distance is superluminal in a geostatic, and therefore non-inertial, frame of reference.

=== Light spots and shadows ===
If a laser beam is swept across a distant object, the spot of laser light can seem to move across the object at a speed greater than c. Similarly, a shadow projected onto a distant object seems to move across the object faster than c. In neither case does the light travel from the source to the object faster than c, nor does any information travel faster than light. No object is moving in these examples. For comparison, consider water squirting out of a garden hose as it is swung side to side: water does not instantly follow the direction of the hose.

=== Closing speeds ===
The rate at which two objects in motion in a single frame of reference get closer together is called the mutual or closing speed. This may approach twice the speed of light, as in the case of two particles travelling at close to the speed of light in opposite directions with respect to the reference frame.

Imagine two fast-moving particles approaching each other from opposite sides of a particle accelerator of the collider type. The closing speed would be the rate at which the distance between the two particles is decreasing. From the point of view of an observer standing at rest relative to the accelerator, this rate will be slightly less than twice the speed of light.

Special relativity does not prohibit this. Instead, it implies that it is wrong to use Galilean relativity to compute the velocity of one of the particles, as would be measured by an observer traveling alongside the other particle. That is, special relativity gives the correct velocity-addition formula for computing such relative velocity.

It is instructive to compute the relative velocity of particles moving at v and −v in accelerator frame, which corresponds to the closing speed of 2v > c. Expressing the speeds in units of c, β = v/c:

$$\beta_\text{rel} = \frac{\beta + \beta}{1 + \beta ^2} = \frac{2\beta}{1 + \beta^2} \leq 1.$$

=== Proper speeds ===
If a spaceship travels to a planet one light-year (as measured in the Earth's rest frame) away from Earth at high speed, the time taken to reach that planet could be less than one year as measured by the traveller's clock (although it will always be more than one year as measured by a clock on Earth). The value obtained by dividing the distance traveled, as determined in the Earth's frame, by the time taken, measured by the traveller's clock, is known as a proper speed or a proper velocity. There is no limit on the value of a proper speed as a proper speed does not represent a speed measured in a single inertial frame. A light signal that left the Earth at the same time as the traveller would always get to the destination before the traveller would.

=== Phase velocities above c ===
The phase velocity of an electromagnetic wave, when traveling through a medium, can routinely exceed c, the vacuum velocity of light. For example, this occurs in most glasses at X-ray frequencies. However, the phase velocity of a wave corresponds to the propagation speed of a theoretical single-frequency (purely monochromatic) component of the wave at that frequency. Such a wave component must be infinite in extent and of constant amplitude (otherwise it is not truly monochromatic), and so cannot convey any information. Thus a phase velocity above c does not imply the propagation of signals with a velocity above c.

=== Group velocities above c ===
The group velocity of a wave may also exceed c in some circumstances. In such cases, which typically at the same time involve rapid attenuation of the intensity, the maximum of the envelope of a pulse may travel with a velocity above c. However, even this situation does not imply the propagation of signals with a velocity above c, even though one may be tempted to associate pulse maxima with signals. The latter association has been shown to be misleading, because the information on the arrival of a pulse can be obtained before the pulse maximum arrives. For example, if some mechanism allows the full transmission of the leading part of a pulse while strongly attenuating the pulse maximum and everything behind (distortion), the pulse maximum is effectively shifted forward in time, while the information on the pulse does not come faster than c without this effect. However, group velocity can exceed c in some parts of a Gaussian beam in vacuum (without attenuation). The diffraction causes the peak of the pulse to propagate faster, while overall power does not.

=== Cosmic expansion ===
According to Hubble's law, the expansion of the universe causes distant galaxies to appear to recede from the Earth faster than the speed of light. However, the recession speed associated with Hubble's law, defined as the rate of increase in proper distance per interval of cosmological time, is not a velocity in a relativistic sense. Moreover, in general relativity, velocity is a local notion, and there is not even a unique definition for the relative velocity of a cosmologically distant object. Faster-than-light cosmological recession speeds are entirely a coordinate effect.

There are many galaxies visible in telescopes with redshift numbers of 1.4 or higher. All of these have cosmological recession speeds greater than the speed of light. Because the Hubble parameter is decreasing with time, there can actually be cases where a galaxy that is receding from the Earth faster than light does manage to emit a signal which reaches the Earth eventually.

However, because the expansion of the universe is accelerating, it is projected that most galaxies will eventually cross a type of cosmological event horizon where any light they emit past that point will never be able to reach the Earth any time in the infinite future, because the light never reaches a point where its "peculiar velocity" towards the Earth exceeds the expansion velocity away from the Earth (these two notions of velocity are also discussed in Comoving and proper distances § Uses of the proper distance). The current distance to this cosmological event horizon is about 16 billion light-years, meaning that a signal from an event happening at present would eventually be able to reach the Earth in the future if the event was less than 16 billion light-years away, but the signal would never arrive if the event was more than 16 billion light-years away.

=== Astronomical observations ===
Apparent superluminal motion is observed in many radio galaxies, blazars, quasars, and recently also in microquasars. The effect was predicted before it was observed by Martin Rees and can be explained as an optical illusion caused by the object partly moving in the direction of the observer, when the speed calculations assume it does not. The phenomenon does not contradict the theory of special relativity. Corrected calculations show these objects have velocities close to the speed of light (relative to our reference frame). They are the first examples of large amounts of mass moving at close to the speed of light. Earth-bound laboratories have only been able to accelerate small numbers of elementary particles to such speeds.

=== Quantum mechanics ===
Certain phenomena in quantum mechanics, such as quantum entanglement, might give the superficial impression of allowing communication of information faster than light. According to the no-communication theorem these phenomena do not allow true communication; they only let two observers in different locations see the same system simultaneously, without any way of controlling what either sees. Wavefunction collapse can be viewed as an epiphenomenon of quantum decoherence, which in turn is nothing more than an effect of the underlying local time evolution of the wavefunction of a system and all of its environment. Since the underlying behavior does not violate local causality or allow faster-than-light communication, it follows that neither does the additional effect of wavefunction collapse, whether real or apparent.

The uncertainty principle implies that individual photons may travel for short distances at speeds somewhat faster (or slower) than c, even in vacuum; this possibility must be taken into account when enumerating Feynman diagrams for a particle interaction. However, it was shown in 2011 that a single photon may not travel faster than c.

There have been various reports in the popular press of experiments on faster-than-light transmission in optics — most often in the context of a kind of quantum tunnelling phenomenon. Usually, such reports deal with a phase velocity or group velocity faster than the vacuum velocity of light. However, as stated above, a superluminal phase velocity cannot be used for faster-than-light transmission of information.

==== Hartman effect ====
The Hartman effect is the tunneling effect through a barrier where the tunneling time tends to a constant for large barriers. This could, for instance, be the gap between two prisms. When the prisms are in contact, the light passes straight through, but when there is a gap, the light is refracted. There is a non-zero probability that the photon will tunnel across the gap rather than follow the refracted path.

However, it has been claimed that the Hartman effect cannot actually be used to violate relativity by transmitting signals faster than c, also because the tunnelling time "should not be linked to a velocity since evanescent waves do not propagate". The evanescent waves in the Hartman effect are due to virtual particles and a non-propagating static field, as mentioned in the sections above for gravity and electromagnetism.

==== Casimir effect ====
In physics, the Casimir–Polder force is a physical force exerted between separate objects due to resonance of vacuum energy in the intervening space between the objects. This is sometimes described in terms of virtual particles interacting with the objects, owing to the mathematical form of one possible way of calculating the strength of the effect. Because the strength of the force falls off rapidly with distance, it is only measurable when the distance between the objects is extremely small. Because the effect is due to virtual particles mediating a static field effect, it is subject to the comments about static fields discussed above.

==== EPR paradox ====
The EPR paradox is a thought experiment of Albert Einstein, Boris Podolsky and Nathan Rosen, and is named after their surnames. In this experiment, the two measurements of an entangled state are correlated even when the measurements are distant from the source and each other. However, no information can be transmitted this way; the answer to whether or not the measurement actually affects the other quantum system comes down to which interpretation of quantum mechanics one subscribes to.

An experiment performed in 1997 by Nicolas Gisin has demonstrated quantum correlations between particles separated by over 10 kilometers. But as noted earlier, the non-local correlations seen in entanglement cannot actually be used to transmit classical information faster than light, so that relativistic causality is preserved. The situation is akin to sharing a synchronized coin flip, where the second person to flip their coin will always see the opposite of what the first person sees, but neither has any way of knowing whether they were the first or second flipper, without communicating classically. See No-communication theorem for further information. A 2008 quantum physics experiment also performed by Nicolas Gisin and his colleagues has determined that if the correlations are caused by a quantum non-local connection (what Einstein called "spooky action at a distance") its speed is at least 10,000 times the speed of light.

==== Delayed choice quantum eraser ====
The delayed-choice quantum eraser is a version of the EPR paradox in which the observation (or not) of interference after the passage of a photon through a double slit experiment depends on the conditions of observation of a second photon entangled with the first. The characteristic of this experiment is that the observation of the second photon can take place at a later time than the observation of the first photon, which may give the impression that the measurement of the later photons "retroactively" determines whether the earlier photons show interference or not, although the interference pattern can only be seen by correlating the measurements of both members of every pair and so it cannot be observed until both photons have been measured, ensuring that an experimenter watching only the photons going through the slit does not obtain information about the other photons in an faster-than-light or backwards-in-time manner.

== Superluminal communication ==
Faster-than-light communication is, according to relativity, equivalent to time travel. What is measured as the speed of light in vacuum (or near vacuum) is actually the fundamental physical constant c. This means that all inertial and, for the coordinate speed of light, non-inertial observers, regardless of their relative velocity, will always measure zero-mass particles such as photons traveling at c in vacuum. This result means that measurements of time and velocity in different frames are no longer related simply by constant shifts, but are instead related by Poincaré transformations. These transformations have important implications:

- The relativistic momentum of a massive particle would increase with speed in such a way that at the speed of light an object would have infinite momentum.
- To accelerate an object of non-zero rest mass to c would require infinite time with any finite acceleration, or infinite acceleration for a finite amount of time.
- Either way, such acceleration requires infinite energy.
- Some observers with sub-light relative motion will disagree about which occurs first of any two events that are separated by a space-like interval. In other words, any travel that is faster-than-light will be seen as traveling backwards in time in some other, equally valid, frames of reference, or need to assume the speculative hypothesis of possible Lorentz violations at a presently unobserved scale (for instance the Planck scale). Therefore, any theory which permits "true" FTL also has to cope with time travel and all its associated paradoxes, or else to assume the Lorentz invariance to be a symmetry of thermodynamical statistical nature (hence a symmetry broken at some presently unobserved scale).
- In special relativity the coordinate speed of light is only guaranteed to be c in an inertial frame; in a non-inertial frame the coordinate speed may be different from c. In general relativity no coordinate system on a large region of curved spacetime is "inertial", so it is permissible to use a global coordinate system where objects travel faster than c, but in the local neighborhood of any point in curved spacetime there can be defined a "local inertial frame" and the local speed of light will be c in this frame, with massive objects moving through this local neighborhood always having a speed less than c in the local inertial frame.

== Justifications ==
=== Casimir vacuum and quantum tunnelling ===
Special relativity postulates that the speed of light in a vacuum is invariant in inertial frames. That is, it will be the same from any frame of reference moving at a constant speed. The equations do not specify any particular value for the speed of light, which is an experimentally determined quantity for a fixed unit of length. Since 1983, the SI unit of length (the meter) has been defined using the speed of light.

The experimental determination has been made in a vacuum, but the observed vacuum is not the only possible vacuum which can exist. The vacuum has energy associated with it, called simply the vacuum energy, which could perhaps be altered in certain cases. When vacuum energy is lowered, light itself has been predicted to go faster than the standard value c. This is known as the Scharnhorst effect. Such a vacuum can be produced by bringing two perfectly smooth metal plates together at near atomic diameter spacing. It is called a Casimir vacuum. Calculations imply that light will go faster in such a vacuum by a minuscule amount: a photon traveling between two plates that are 1 micrometer apart would increase the photon's speed by only about one part in 10^{36}. Accordingly, there has as yet been no experimental verification of the prediction. A recent analysis argued that the Scharnhorst effect cannot be used to send information backwards in time with a single set of plates since the plates' rest frame would define a "preferred frame" for FTL signaling. However, with multiple pairs of plates in motion relative to one another the authors noted that they had no arguments that could "guarantee the total absence of causality violations", and invoked Hawking's speculative chronology protection conjecture which suggests that feedback loops of virtual particles would create "uncontrollable singularities in the renormalized quantum stress-energy" on the boundary of any potential time machine, and thus would require a theory of quantum gravity to fully analyze. Other authors argue that Scharnhorst's original analysis, which seemed to show the possibility of faster-than-c signals, involved approximations which may be incorrect, so that it is not clear whether this effect could actually increase signal speed at all.

It was later claimed by Eckle et al. that particle tunneling does indeed occur in zero real time. Their tests involved tunneling electrons, where the group argued a relativistic prediction for tunneling time should be 500–600 attoseconds (an attosecond is one quintillionth (10^{−18}) of a second). All that could be measured was 24 attoseconds, which is the limit of the test accuracy. Again, though, other physicists believe that tunneling experiments in which particles appear to spend anomalously short times inside the barrier are in fact fully compatible with relativity, although there is disagreement about whether the explanation involves reshaping of the wave packet or other effects.

=== Give up (absolute) relativity ===
Because of the strong empirical support for special relativity, any modifications to it must necessarily be quite subtle and difficult to measure. The best-known attempt is doubly special relativity, which posits that the Planck length is also the same in all reference frames, and is associated with the work of Giovanni Amelino-Camelia and João Magueijo. There are speculative theories that claim inertia is produced by the combined mass of the universe (e.g., Mach's principle), which implies that the rest frame of the universe might be preferred by conventional measurements of natural law. If confirmed, this would imply special relativity is an approximation to a more general theory, but since the relevant comparison would (by definition) be outside the observable universe, it is difficult to imagine (much less construct) experiments to test this hypothesis. Despite this difficulty, such experiments have been proposed.

=== Spacetime distortion ===
Although the theory of special relativity forbids objects to have a relative velocity greater than light speed, and general relativity reduces to special relativity in a local sense (in small regions of spacetime where curvature is negligible), general relativity does allow the space between distant objects to expand in such a way that they have a "recession velocity" which exceeds the speed of light, and it is thought that galaxies which are at a distance of more than about 14 billion light-years the Earth today have a recession velocity which is faster than light. Miguel Alcubierre theorized that it would be possible to create a warp drive, in which a ship would be enclosed in a "warp bubble" where the space at the front of the bubble is rapidly contracting and the space at the back is rapidly expanding, with the result that the bubble can reach a distant destination much faster than a light beam moving outside the bubble, but without objects inside the bubble locally traveling faster than light. However, several objections raised against the Alcubierre drive appear to rule out the possibility of actually using it in any practical fashion. Another possibility predicted by general relativity is the traversable wormhole, which could create a shortcut between arbitrarily distant points in space. As with the Alcubierre drive, travelers moving through the wormhole would not locally move faster than light travelling through the wormhole alongside them, but they would be able to reach their destination (and return to their starting location) faster than light traveling outside the wormhole.

Gerald Cleaver and Richard Obousy, a professor and student of Baylor University, theorized that manipulating the extra spatial dimensions of string theory around a spaceship with an extremely large amount of energy would create a "bubble" that could cause the ship to travel faster than the speed of light. To create this bubble, the physicists believe manipulating the 10th spatial dimension would alter the dark energy in three large spatial dimensions: height, width and length. Cleaver said positive dark energy is currently responsible for speeding up the expansion rate of our universe as time moves on.

=== Lorentz symmetry violation ===
The possibility that Lorentz symmetry may be violated has been seriously considered in the last two decades, particularly after the development of a realistic effective field theory that describes this possible violation, the so-called Standard-Model Extension. This general framework has allowed experimental searches by ultra-high energy cosmic-ray experiments and a wide variety of experiments in gravity, electrons, protons, neutrons, neutrinos, mesons, and photons. The breaking of rotation and boost invariance causes direction dependence in the theory as well as unconventional energy dependence that introduces novel effects, including Lorentz-violating neutrino oscillations and modifications to the dispersion relations of different particle species, which naturally could make particles move faster than light.

In some models of broken Lorentz symmetry, it is postulated that the symmetry is still built into the most fundamental laws of physics, but that spontaneous symmetry breaking of Lorentz invariance shortly after the Big Bang could have left a "relic field" throughout the universe which causes particles to behave differently depending on their velocity relative to the field; however, there are also some models where Lorentz symmetry is broken in a more fundamental way. If Lorentz symmetry can cease to be a fundamental symmetry at the Planck scale or at some other fundamental scale, it is conceivable that particles with a critical speed different from the speed of light be the ultimate constituents of matter.

In current models of Lorentz symmetry violation, the phenomenological parameters are expected to be energy-dependent. Therefore, as widely recognized, existing low-energy bounds cannot be applied to high-energy phenomena; however, many searches for Lorentz violation at high energies have been carried out using the Standard-Model Extension. Lorentz symmetry violation is expected to become stronger as one gets closer to the fundamental scale.

=== Superfluid theories of physical vacuum ===
In this approach, the physical vacuum is viewed as a quantum superfluid which is essentially non-relativistic, whereas Lorentz symmetry is not an exact symmetry of nature but rather the approximate description valid only for the small fluctuations of the superfluid background. Within the framework of the approach, a theory was proposed in which the physical vacuum is conjectured to be a quantum Bose liquid whose ground-state wavefunction is described by the logarithmic Schrödinger equation. It was shown that the relativistic gravitational interaction arises as the small-amplitude collective excitation mode whereas relativistic elementary particles can be described by the particle-like modes in the limit of low momenta. The important fact is that at very high velocities the behavior of the particle-like modes becomes distinct from the relativistic one – they can reach the speed of light limit at finite energy; also, faster-than-light propagation is possible without requiring moving objects to have imaginary mass.

== FTL neutrino flight results ==
=== MINOS experiment ===
High precision measurements from the MINOS collaboration for the flight-time of 3 GeV neutrinos yielded a speed (v/c−1)=(1.0±1.1)×10^{−6}, that is equal to the speed of light to one part in a million.

=== OPERA neutrino anomaly ===
On September 22, 2011, a preprint from the OPERA Collaboration indicated detection of 17 and 28 GeV muon neutrinos, sent 730 kilometers (454 miles) from CERN near Geneva, Switzerland to the Gran Sasso National Laboratory in Italy, traveling faster than light by a relative amount of 2.48×10^{−5} (approximately 1 in 40,000), a statistic with 6.0-sigma significance. On 17 November 2011, a second follow-up experiment by OPERA scientists confirmed their initial results. However, scientists were skeptical about the results of these experiments, the significance of which was disputed. In March 2012, the ICARUS collaboration failed to reproduce the OPERA results with their equipment, detecting neutrino travel time from CERN to the Gran Sasso National Laboratory indistinguishable from the speed of light. Later the OPERA team reported two flaws in their equipment set-up that had caused errors far outside their original confidence interval: a fiber-optic cable attached improperly, which caused the apparently faster-than-light measurements, and a clock oscillator ticking too fast.

== Tachyons ==
In special relativity, it is impossible to accelerate an object to the speed of light, or for an object with mass to move at the speed of light. However, it might be possible for an object to exist which always moves faster than light. The hypothetical elementary particles with this property are called tachyons or tachyonic particles. Attempts to quantize them failed to produce faster-than-light particles, and instead illustrated that their presence leads to an instability.

Various theorists have suggested that the neutrino might have a tachyonic nature, while others have disputed the possibility.

== General relativity ==
General relativity was developed after special relativity to include the effects of gravity. It maintains the principle that no object can accelerate to the speed of light in the reference frame of any observer. However, it permits distortions in spacetime that allow an object to move faster than light from the point of view of a distant observer. This Alcubierre drive can be thought of as producing a ripple in spacetime that carries an object along with it much like the science fiction warp drive. However to create such a distortion would require exotic matter that violates energy conditions that apply to all known matter. Another possible system is the wormhole, which connects two distant locations as though by a shortcut. Both distortions would need to create a very strong curvature in a highly localized region of space-time and their gravity fields would be immense.

== In fiction and popular culture ==
Faster-than-light travel is a common plot device in science fiction.

== See also ==
- Faster-than-light neutrino anomaly
- Intergalactic travel
- Krasnikov tube
- Slow light
- Variable speed of light
- Wheeler–Feynman absorber theory
- Gravitational lens
- Event horizon of a black hole
