= Serguei Krasnikov =

Russian physicist

Serguei Vladilenovich Krasnikov (Russian: Серге́й Владиле́нович Кра́сников; 10 September 1961 – 19 March 2024) was a Russian physicist, Doctor of Sciences in Physical and Mathematical Sciences, graduate of Leningrad State University. He became famous for his contributions to theoretical physics, in particular the development and mathematical modeling of the Krasnikov tube and its influence on the principle of causality, closed timelike curves and superluminal motion.

== Life ==
Krasnikov obtained a doctorate (CSc.) in physics and mathematics from Leningrad State University in 1985. In 1987–1990 he worked at the Navy Institute of Radioelectronics. From 1990 to his death in 2024 he was based at Pulkovo Observatory in St. Petersburg, Russia.

Krasnikov's work was focused on theoretical physics, specifically on the development of the Krasnikov tube and its applications in causality, closed timelike curves, and hyperfast travel.

In 2001, Krasnikov worked at Starlab, in a joint NASA/USAF-funded project to assess the viability of time travel under realistic physical conditions.

In 2002, he attended the 11th UK Conference on the Foundations of Physics hosted by the Faculty of Philosophy, University of Oxford at which he delivered the paper "Time machine (1988–2001)".

== See also ==
- Alcubierre drive
- Wormhole
