= Krasnikov tube =

Speculative mechanism for achieving faster-than-light travel

A Krasnikov tube is a speculative mechanism for space travel involving the warping of spacetime into permanent superluminal tunnels. The resulting structure is analogous to a wormhole or an immobile Alcubierre drive (and like them, it requires exotic matter with negative energy density) with the endpoints displaced in time as well as space. The idea was proposed by Sergey Krasnikov in 1995.

== Structure ==
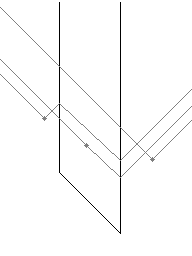
This spacetime diagram shows the causal structure of a Krasnikov tube; the U-shaped line is the boundary of the tube, while the diagonal lines represent the forward light cones of the dots.

The tube is a distortion of spacetime that can be intentionally created (using hypothetical technology) in the wake of travel near the speed of light. A single Krasnikov tube allows for a return trip from the distant destination to Earth in an arbitrarily short Earth‑measured time, effectively eliminating the long return journey while preserving causality. Experiencing this effect requires that the traveler traverse the tube at speeds close to that of light.

== Causality violations ==
=== One-tube case ===
Krasnikov argued that despite the time machine aspects of his metric, it cannot violate the law of causality (that a cause must always precede its effects in all coordinate systems and along all space-time paths) because all points along the round-trip path of the spaceship always have an ordered timelike separation interval (in algebraic terms, c^{2}dt^{2} is always larger than dx^{2} + dy^{2} + dz^{2}). This means, for example, that a light-beam message sent along a Krasnikov tube cannot be used for back-in-time signaling.

=== Two-tube case ===
The two-tube case is a more elaborate configuration involving two Krasnikov tubes in opposite directions. This configuration can produce a closed timelike curve, making the causality violations more explicit than in the one-tube case. It was proposed by Allen E. Everett and Thomas A. Roman of Tufts University that two Krasnikov tubes going in opposite directions can create a closed timelike curve, which would violate causality.

For example, suppose that a tube is built connecting Earth to a star 3000 light-years away. The astronauts are travelling at relativistic velocities, so that the journey through this Tube I only takes 1.5 years from their perspective. Then the astronauts lay down tube II rather than travelling back in tube I, the first tube they produced. In another 1.5 years of ship time they will arrive back on Earth, but at a time 6000 years in the future of their departure. But now that two Krasnikov tubes are in place, astronauts from the future can travel to the star in tube II, then to Earth in tube I and will arrive 6000 years earlier than their departure. The Krasnikov tube system has become a time machine.

In 1993, Matt Visser argued that the two mouths of a wormhole with an induced clock difference could not be brought together without causing quantum field and gravitational effects that would either make the wormhole collapse or the two mouths repel each other. (See Time travel using wormholes and the Chronology protection conjecture.) It has been suggested that a similar mechanism would destroy time-machine Krasnikov tubes. That is, vacuum fluctuation would grow exponentially, eventually destroying the second Krasnikov tube as it approaches the timelike loop limit, in which causality is violated.

== See also ==
- Wormhole
- Time travel
- Wheeler–Feynman absorber theory
