= Ellis drainhole =

Mathematical model of a wormhole

The Ellis drainhole is the earliest-known complete mathematical model of a traversable wormhole. It is a static, spherically symmetric solution of the Einstein vacuum field equations augmented by inclusion of a scalar field $\phi$ minimally coupled to the geometry of space-time with coupling polarity opposite to the orthodox polarity (negative instead of positive):

${\mathbf R}_{\mu \nu} - \textstyle{\frac12} {\mathbf R} \, g_{\mu \nu} = - 2 \, \left(\phi_{,\mu} \phi_{,\nu} - \textstyle{\frac12} \phi^{,\kappa} \phi_{,\kappa} \, g_{\mu \nu}\right) \, .$

== Overview ==
The solution was found in 1969 (date of first submission) by Homer G. Ellis, (Note: The ${\mathbf R}_{\mu \nu}$ used here are the negatives of those in the Ellis paper.) and independently around the same time by Kirill A. Bronnikov. Bronnikov pointed out that a two-dimensional analog of the topology of the solution is a hyperboloid of one sheet, and that only use of the antiorthodox coupling polarity would allow a solution with such a topology. Ellis, whose motivation was to find a nonsingular replacement for the Schwarzschild model of an elementary gravitating particle, showed that only the antiorthodox polarity would do, but found all the solutions for either polarity, as did Bronnikov. He studied the geometry of the solution manifold for the antiorthodox polarity in considerable depth and found it to be

- composed of two asymptotically flat three-dimensional regions joined at a two-sphere (the 'drainhole'),
- singularity-free,
- devoid of one-way event horizons,
- geodesically complete
- gravitationally attractive on one side of the drainhole and more strongly repulsive on the other,
- equipped with a timelike vector field he interpreted as the velocity field of an 'ether' flowing from
  rest at infinity on the attractive side, down into the drainhole and out to infinity on the repulsive
  side, 'creating' (or responding to) gravity by accelerating all the way, and
- traversable through the drainhole in either direction by photons and test particles.

A paper by Chetouani and Clément gave the name "Ellis geometry" to the special case of a drainhole in which the ether is not flowing and there is no gravity, as did also a letter to an editor by Clément. This special case is often referred to as the "Ellis wormhole". When the full-blown drainhole is considered in its role as the prototypical traversable wormhole, the name of Bronnikov is attached to it alongside that of Ellis.

== The drainhole solution ==
Equatorial cross section of the Ellis wormhole (not drainhole), a catenoid $\mathcal C$

Imagine two euclidean planes, one above the other. Pick two circles of the same radius, one above the other, and remove their interiors. Now glue the exteriors together at the circles, bending the exteriors smoothly so that there is no sharp edge at the gluing. If done with care the result will be the catenoid $\mathcal C$ pictured at right, or something similar. Next, picture the whole connected upper and lower space filled with a fluid flowing with no swirling into the hole from above and out the lower side, gaining speed all the way and bending the lower region into a more conical shape than is seen in $\mathcal C.$ If you imagine stepping this movie up from flat screen to 3D, replacing the planes by euclidean three-spaces and the circles by spheres, and think of the fluid as flowing from all directions into the hole from above, and out below with directions unchanged, you will have a pretty good idea of what a 'drainhole' is. The technical description of a drainhole as a space-time manifold is provided by the space-time metric published in 1973.

The drainhole metric solution as presented by Ellis in 1973 has the proper-time forms (with the presence of $c$ made explicit)

$$\begin{align}
c^2 d\tau^2 &= c^2 dt^2 - [d\rho - f(\rho) \, c \, dt]^2
- r^2 (\rho) \, d\Omega^2 \\
&= \left[1 - f^2(\rho)\right] \, c^2 dT^2
- \frac{1}{1 - f^2(\rho)} \, d\rho^2
- r^2(\rho) \, d\Omega^2
\end{align} \, ,$$

where $\;\; d\Omega^2 = d\vartheta^2 + (\sin \vartheta)^2 d\varphi^2 \;\;$ and $\;\; T = t + {\displaystyle \frac{1}{c} \! \int \!\!\! \frac{f(\rho)}{1 - f^2(\rho)} \, d\rho \, .}$

The solution depends on two parameters, $m$ and $n$, satisfying the inequalities $0 \leq m < n$ but otherwise unconstrained. In terms of these the functions $f$ and $r$ are given by

$f(\rho) = -\sqrt{1 - e^{-(2 \, m/n) \phi}}$

and

$r(\rho) = \textstyle \sqrt{(\rho - m)^2 + a^2}$$e^{(m/n) \phi} = \sqrt{\frac{(\rho - m)^2 + a^2}{1 - f^2(\rho)}} \, ,$

in which

$\phi = \alpha(\rho) = \frac{n}{a} \left[\frac{\pi}{2} - \tan^{-1} \left(\frac{\rho - m}{a}\right)\right]$ and $\; a = \sqrt{n^2 - m^2}.$

The coordinate ranges are

$-\infty < t \, ,T < \infty \, , \;\, -\infty < \rho < \infty \, , \;\; 0 < \vartheta < \pi \, , \;\;$ and $\;\, -\pi < \varphi < \pi \, .$

(To facilitate comparison with the Schwarzschild solution, $\rho$ of the original solution has been replaced by $\rho - m.$)

Asymptotically, as $\rho \to \infty$,

$\alpha(\rho) \sim n/\rho \, , \;\; r(\rho) \sim \rho \, , \;\; f(\rho) \sim -\sqrt{2m/\rho} \, , \;\;$ and $\;\; f^2(\rho) \sim 2m/\rho \, .$

These show, upon comparison of the drainhole metric to the Schwarzschild metric

$$\begin{align}
c^2 d\tau^2 &= c^2 dt^2 - [d\rho - f_\text{S}(\rho) \, c \, dt]^2
- r^2_\text{S} (\rho) \, d\Omega^2 \\
&= \left[1 - f^2_\text{S}(\rho)\right] \, c^2 \, dT^2
- \frac{1}{1 - f^2_\text{S}(\rho)} \, d\rho^2
- r^2_S(\rho) \, d\Omega^2 \, ,
\end{align}$$

where, in partially ($G = c$) geometrized units,

$r_\text{S}(\rho) = \rho \, , \;\; f_\text{S}(\rho) = -\sqrt{2M/\rho} \, , \;\;$ and $\;\; f^2_\text{S}(\rho) = 2M/\rho \, ,$

that the parameter $m$ is the analog for the drainhole of the Schwarzschild mass parameter $M$.

On the other side, as $\rho \to -\infty$,

$\alpha(\rho) \sim n \pi/a \, , \;\; r(\rho) \sim -\rho e^{m \pi/a} \, , \;\;$ and $\;\; f^2(\rho) \sim 1 - e^{-2 m \pi/a} \, .$

The graph of $r$ below exhibits these asymptotics, as well as the fact that, corresponding to $\rho = 2M$ (where the Schwarzschild metric has its notorious one-way event horizon separating the exterior, where $\rho > 2M$, from the black hole interior, where $\rho < 2M$), $r$ attains at $\rho = 2m$ a positive minimum value at which the 'upper' region (where $\rho > 2m$) opens out into a more spacious 'lower' region (where $\rho < 2m$).

Graph of $r$

Graph of $f^2$

=== The ether flow ===
The vector field $\partial_t + c f(\rho) \partial_\rho$ generates radial geodesics parametrized by proper time $\tau$, which agrees with coordinate time $t$ along the geodesics.

As may be inferred from the graph of $f^2$, a test particle following one of these geodesics starts from rest at $\rho = \infty,$ falls downward toward the drainhole gaining speed all the way, passes through the drainhole and out into the lower region still gaining speed in the downward direction, and arrives at $\rho = -\infty$ with

$\mathrm{speed}= c |f(-\infty)|= c \sqrt{1 - e^{-2m \pi/a}} < c.$

The vector field in question is taken to be the velocity field of a more or less substantial 'ether' pervading all of space-time. This ether is in general "more than a mere inert medium for the propagation of electromagnetic waves; it is a restless, flowing continuum whose internal, relative motions manifest themselves to us as gravity. Mass particles appear as sources or sinks of this flowing ether."

For timelike geodesics in general the radial equation of motion is

$$\begin{align}
\frac{d^2 \rho}{d \tau^2} &= -\left(\frac{f^2}{2}\right)^{\mathbf \prime}(\rho)
+ (\rho - 3m)\left(\frac{d \Omega}{d \tau}\right)^2 \\
&= -\frac{m}{r^2(\rho)}
+ (\rho - 3m)\left(\frac{d \Omega}{d \tau}\right)^2 \, .
\end{align}$$

One sees from this that

- it is the 'stretching' of the ether flow as measured by the term $-(f^2/2)'(\rho)$ that produces the downward pull of gravity,
- every test particle whose orbit dips as low as $\rho = 3m$ will fall through the drainhole,
- there are test particles with enough angular speed $|d\Omega/d\tau|$ to balance the downward pull that their orbits (circular ones in particular) are confined to the part of the upper region where $\rho >3m$,
- the downward pull produces in the upper region acceleration toward the drainhole, thus attractive gravity, but in the lower region acceleration away from the drainhole, thus repulsive gravity,
- the downward pull reaches its maximum where $r(\rho)$ is a minimum, namely, at the 'throat' of the drainhole where $\rho = 2m$, and
- if $m = 0,$ a test particle can sit at rest (with $d\rho/d\tau = d\Omega/d\tau = 0$) anywhere in space. (This is the special case of the nongravitating drainhole known as the Ellis wormhole.)

=== Traversability ===
It is clear from the radial equation of motion that test particles starting from any point in the upper region with no radial velocity ($d\rho/d\tau = 0$) will, without sufficient angular velocity $d\Omega/d\tau$, fall down through the drainhole and into the lower region. Not so clear but nonetheless true is that a test particle starting from a point in the lower region can with sufficient upward velocity pass through the drainhole and into the upper region. Thus the drainhole is 'traversable' by test particles in both directions. The same holds for photons.

A complete catalog of geodesics of the drainhole can be found in the Ellis paper.

=== Absence of horizons and singularities; geodesical completeness ===
For a metric of the general form of the drainhole metric, with $\partial_t + c f(\rho) \partial_\rho$ as the velocity field of a flowing ether, the coordinate velocities $d\rho/dt$ of radial null geodesics are found to be $c(f(\rho) + 1)$ for light waves traveling against the ether flow, and $c(f(\rho) - 1)$ for light waves traveling with the flow. Wherever $f(\rho) > -1$, so that $c(f(\rho) + 1) > 0$, light waves struggling against the ether flow can gain ground. On the other hand, at places where $f(\rho) \leq -1$ upstream light waves can at best hold their own (if $f(\rho) = -1$), or otherwise be swept downstream to wherever the ether is going (if $f(\rho) < -1$). (This situation is described in jest by: "People in light canoes should avoid ethereal rapids.")

The latter situation is seen in the Schwarzschild metric, where $\textstyle f_\text{S}(\rho) = -\sqrt{2M/\rho} \,$, which is $-1$ at the Schwarzschild event horizon where $r_\text{S}(\rho) = \rho = 2M$, and less than $-1$ inside the horizon where $\rho < 2M$.

By contrast, in the drainhole $\textstyle f^2(\rho) < 1 - e^{-2m \pi/a} < 1$ and $\textstyle f(\rho) = -\left[f^2(\rho)\right]^{1/2} > -1$, for every value of $\rho$, so nowhere is there a horizon on one side of which light waves struggling against the ether flow cannot gain ground.

Because

- $r$ and $f$ are defined on the whole real line, and
- $r$ is bounded away from $0$ by $r(2m)$), and
- $f^2$ is bounded away from $1$ (by $\sqrt{1 - e^{-2m \pi/a}}$),

the drainhole metric encompasses neither a 'coordinate singularity' where $1 - f^2(\rho) \to 0$ nor a 'geometric singularity' where $r(\rho) \to 0$, not even asymptotic ones. For the same reasons, every geodesic with an unbound orbit, and with some additional argument every geodesic with a bound orbit, has an affine parametrization whose parameter extends from $-\infty$ to $\infty$. The drainhole manifold is, therefore, geodesically complete.

=== Strength of repulsion ===
As seen earlier, stretching of the ether flow produces in the upper region a downward acceleration $-m/r^2(\rho)$ of test particles that, along with $r(\rho) \sim \rho$ as $\rho \to \infty$, identifies $m$ as the attractive gravitational mass of the nonlocalized drainhole particle. In the lower region the downward acceleration is formally the same, but because $r(\rho)$ is asymptotic to $-\rho e^{m \pi/a}$ rather than to $-\rho$ as $\rho \to -\infty$, one cannot infer that the repulsive gravitational mass of the drainhole particle is $-m$.

To learn the repulsive mass of the drainhole requires finding an isometry of the drainhole manifold that exchanges the upper and lower regions. Such an isometry can be described as follows: Let $M_{m,n}$ denote the drainhole manifold whose parameters are $m$ and $n$, and $M_{\bar m,\bar n}$ denote the drainhole manifold whose parameters are $\bar m$ and $\bar n$, where

$\bar m = -m e^{m \pi/a}$

and

$\;\; \bar n = n e^{m \pi/a}.$

The isometry identifies the point of $M_{m,n}$ having coordinates $[T,\rho,\vartheta,\varphi]$ with the point of $M_{\bar m,\bar n}$ having coordinates $[\bar T,\bar\rho,\bar\vartheta,\bar\varphi] = [T e^{-m \pi/a},-\rho e^{m \pi/a},\vartheta,\varphi]$. One infers from it that $M_{m,n}$ and $M_{\bar m,\bar n}$ are in fact the same manifold, and that the lower region where $\rho \to -\infty,$ now disguised as the upper region where $\bar\rho \to \infty$, has $\bar m$ as its gravitational mass, thus gravitationally repels test particles more strongly than the true upper region attracts them, in the ratio $\, |\bar m|/|m| = -\bar m/m = e^{m \pi/a} > 1$.

=== Asymptotic flatness ===
That the drainhole is asymptotically flat as $\rho \to \infty$ is seen from the asymptotic behavior $r(\rho) \sim \rho$ and $f^2(\rho) \sim 2m/\rho \sim 0.$ That it is asymptotically flat as $\rho \to -\infty$ is seen from the corresponding behavior as $\bar\rho \to \infty$ after the isometry between $M_{m,n}$ and $M_{\bar m,\bar n}$ described above.

=== The parameter n ===
Unlike the parameter $m$, interpreted as the attractive gravitational mass of the drainhole, the parameter $n$ has no obvious physical interpretation. It essentially fixes both the radius $r(2m)$ of the throat of the drainhole, which increases from $n$ when $m = 0$ to $n e$ as $m \to n,$ and the energy of the scalar field $\phi,$ which decreases from $n \pi/2$ when $m = 0$ to $n/2$ as $m \to n$.

For reasons given in Sec. 6.1 of a 2015 paper, Ellis suggests that $n$ specifies in some way the inertial mass of the particle modeled by the drainhole. He writes further that a "'Higgsian' way of expressing this idea is to say that the drainhole 'acquires' (inertial) mass from the scalar field $\phi$".

== Application ==
By disallowing Einstein's unjustified 1916 assumption that inertial mass is a source of gravity, Ellis arrives at new, improved field equations, a solution of which is a cosmological model that fits well the supernovae observations that in 1998 revealed the acceleration of the expansion of the universe. In these equations there are two scalar fields minimally coupled to the space-time geometry with opposite polarities. The "cosmological constant" $\Lambda$ is replaced by a net repulsive density of gravitating matter owed to the presence of primordial drainhole "tunnels" and continuous creation of new tunnels, each with its excess of repulsion over attraction. Those drainhole tunnels associated with particles of visible matter provide their gravity; those not tied to visible matter are the unseen "dark matter". "Dark energy" is the net repulsive density of all the drainhole tunnels. The cosmological model has a "Big Bounce" instead of a "Big Bang", inflationary acceleration out of the bounce, and a smooth transition to an era of decelerative coasting, followed ultimately by a return to de Sitter-like exponential expansion.

== Further applications ==
- The Ellis wormhole served as the starting point for building the traversable wormhole featured in the 2014 movie Interstellar (although the model that was used in the end differed significantly).
- Scattering by an Ellis wormhole
- Spatial lensing (not gravitational lensing, as there is no gravity) in the Ellis wormhole
  - Microlensing by the Ellis wormhole
  - Wave effect in lensing by the Ellis wormhole
  - Image centroid displacements due to microlensing by the Ellis wormhole
  - Exact lens equation for the Ellis wormhole
  - Lensing by wormholes
