= Wormhole =

Hypothetical topological feature of spacetime

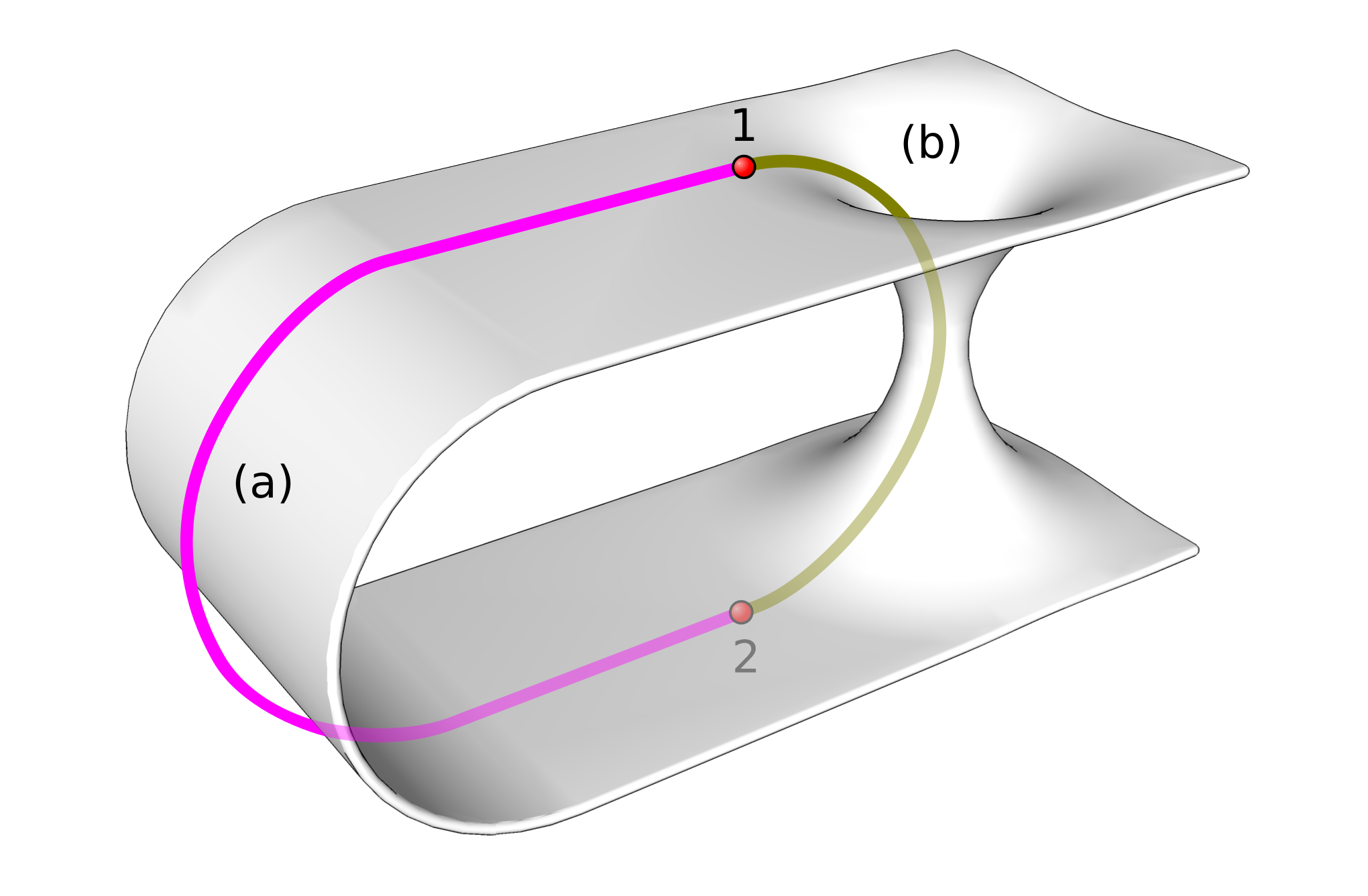
A wormhole visualized as a two-dimensional surface. Route (a) is the shortest path through normal space between points 1 and 2; route (b) is a shorter path through a wormhole.

A wormhole is a hypothetical structure that connects disparate points in spacetime. It can be visualized as a tunnel with two ends at separate points in spacetime (e.g., different locations, different points in time, or both). Wormholes are based on a special solution of the Einstein field equations, and are consistent with the general theory of relativity.

In 1995, Matt Visser suggested that if cosmic strings with negative mass were generated in the early universe, this may indicate the presence of many wormholes in the universe. Physicists, such as Kip Thorne, have suggested that wormholes can be created artificially.

== Terminology ==
In 1928, German mathematician, philosopher and theoretical physicist Hermann Weyl proposed a wormhole hypothesis of matter in connection with mass analysis of electromagnetic field energy; however, he did not use the term "wormhole" (he spoke of "one-dimensional tubes" instead).

The term "worm-holes" appears in British astronomer Arthur Eddington's 1928 popular exposition The Nature of the Physical World, in which he uses it metaphorically for "worm-holes" (material particles) crossing the "grain" of spacetime, rather than for a spacetime shortcut.

American theoretical physicist John Archibald Wheeler (inspired by Weyl's work) used the term "wormhole". In a 1957 paper that he wrote with Charles W. Misner, they write:

This analysis forces one to consider situations ... where there is a net flux of lines of force, through what topologists would call "a handle" of the multiply-connected space, and what physicists might perhaps be excused for more vividly terming a "wormhole".

— Charles Misner and John Wheeler in Annals of Physics

=== Modern definitions ===
From a topological point of view, an intra-universe wormhole (a wormhole between two points in the same universe) is a compact region of spacetime whose boundary is topologically trivial, but whose interior is not simply connected. Formalizing this idea leads to definitions such as the following, taken from Matt Visser's Lorentzian Wormholes (1996).

If a Minkowski spacetime contains a compact region $\Omega$, and if the topology of $\Omega$ is of the form $\Omega \sim {S} \times \Sigma$, where $\Sigma$ is a three-manifold of the nontrivial topology, whose boundary has the topology of the form $\delta\Sigma \sim {S^2}$, and if, furthermore, the hypersurfaces $\Sigma$ are all spacelike, then the region $\Omega$ contains a quasi-permanent intrauniverse wormhole.

From a geometric point of view, wormholes can be described as regions of spacetime that constrain the incremental deformation of closed surfaces. For example, in Enrico Rodrigo's The Physics of Stargates, a wormhole is defined informally as:

a region of spacetime containing a "world tube" (the time evolution of a closed surface) that cannot be continuously deformed (shrunk) to a world line (the time evolution of a point or observer).

== Development ==
"Embedding diagram" of a Schwarzschild wormhole

=== Schwarzschild wormholes ===
The first type of wormhole solution discovered was the Schwarzschild wormhole, which would be present in the Schwarzschild metric describing an eternal black hole, but it was found that it would collapse too quickly for anything to cross from one end to the other. Wormholes that could be crossed in both directions, known as traversable wormholes, were thought to be possible only if exotic matter with negative energy density could be used to stabilize them. Later, physicists reported that microscopic traversable wormholes may be possible and not require any exotic matter, instead requiring only electrically charged fermionic matter with small enough mass that it cannot collapse into a charged black hole. While such wormholes, if possible, may be limited to transfers of information, humanly traversable wormholes may exist if reality can broadly be described by the Randall–Sundrum model 2, a brane-based theory consistent with string theory.

==== Einstein–Rosen bridges ====
Einstein–Rosen bridges (or ER bridges), named after Albert Einstein and Nathan Rosen, are connections between areas of space that can be modeled as vacuum solutions to the Einstein field equations, and that are now understood to be intrinsic parts of the maximally extended version of the Schwarzschild metric describing an eternal black hole with no charge and no rotation. Here, "maximally extended" refers to the idea that the spacetime should not have any "edges": it should be possible to continue this path arbitrarily far into the particle's future or past for any possible trajectory of a free-falling particle (following a geodesic in the spacetime).

In order to satisfy this requirement, it turns out that in addition to the black hole interior region that particles enter when they fall through the event horizon from the outside, there must be a separate white hole interior region that allows us to extrapolate the trajectories of particles that an outside observer sees rising up away from the event horizon. And just as there are two separate interior regions of the maximally extended spacetime, there are also two separate exterior regions, sometimes called two different "universes", with the second universe allowing us to extrapolate some possible particle trajectories in the two interior regions. This means that the interior black hole region can contain a mix of particles that fell in from either universe (and thus an observer who fell in from one universe might be able to see the light that fell in from the other one), and likewise particles from the interior white hole region can escape into either universe. All four regions can be seen in a spacetime diagram that uses Kruskal–Szekeres coordinates.

In this spacetime, it is possible to come up with coordinate systems such that if a hypersurface of constant time (a set of points that all have the same time coordinate, such that every point on the surface has a space-like separation, giving what is called a 'space-like surface') is picked and an "embedding diagram" drawn depicting the curvature of space at that time, the embedding diagram will look like a tube connecting the two exterior regions, known as an "Einstein–Rosen bridge". The Schwarzschild metric describes an idealized black hole that exists eternally from the perspective of external observers; a more realistic black hole that forms at some particular time from a collapsing star would require a different metric. When the infalling stellar matter is added to a diagram of a black hole's geography, it removes the part of the diagram corresponding to the white hole interior region, along with the part of the diagram corresponding to the other universe.

The Einstein–Rosen bridge was discovered by Ludwig Flamm in 1916, a few months after Schwarzschild published his solution, and was rediscovered by Albert Einstein and his colleague Nathan Rosen, who published their result in 1935. In 1962, John Archibald Wheeler and Robert W. Fuller published a paper showing that this type of wormhole is unstable if it connects two parts of the same universe, and that it will pinch off too quickly for light (or any particle moving slower than light) that falls in from one exterior region to make it to the other exterior region.

According to general relativity, the gravitational collapse of a sufficiently compact mass forms a singular Schwarzschild black hole. In the Einstein–Cartan–Sciama–Kibble theory of gravity, however, it forms a regular Einstein–Rosen bridge. This theory extends general relativity by removing a constraint of the symmetry of the affine connection and regarding its antisymmetric part, the torsion tensor, as a dynamic variable. Torsion naturally accounts for the quantum-mechanical, intrinsic angular momentum (spin) of matter. The minimal coupling between torsion and Dirac spinors generates a repulsive spin–spin interaction that is significant in fermionic matter at extremely high densities. Such an interaction prevents the formation of a gravitational singularity (e.g. a black hole). Instead, the collapsing matter reaches an enormous but finite density and rebounds, forming the other side of the bridge.

Although Schwarzschild wormholes are not traversable in both directions, their existence inspired Kip Thorne to imagine traversable wormholes created by holding the "throat" of a Schwarzschild wormhole open with exotic matter (material that has negative mass/energy).

Other non-traversable wormholes include Lorentzian wormholes (first proposed by John Archibald Wheeler in 1957), wormholes creating a spacetime foam in a general relativistic spacetime manifold depicted by a Lorentzian manifold, and Euclidean wormholes (named after Euclidean manifold, a structure of Riemannian manifold).

=== Traversable wormholes ===
The Casimir effect shows that quantum field theory allows the energy density in certain regions of space to be negative relative to the ordinary matter vacuum energy, but it has been shown theoretically that quantum field theory disallows states where energy can be arbitrarily negative for an arbitrary length of time. Some physicists, such as Stephen Hawking, Kip Thorne, and others, argued that such effects might make it possible to stabilize a traversable wormhole. The only known natural process that is theoretically predicted to form a wormhole in the context of general relativity and quantum mechanics was put forth by Juan Maldacena and Leonard Susskind in their ER = EPR conjecture. The quantum foam hypothesis is sometimes used to suggest that tiny wormholes might appear and disappear spontaneously at the Planck scale, and stable versions of such wormholes have been suggested as dark matter candidates. It has also been proposed that, if a tiny wormhole held open by a negative mass cosmic string had appeared around the time of the Big Bang, it could have been inflated to macroscopic size by cosmic inflation.

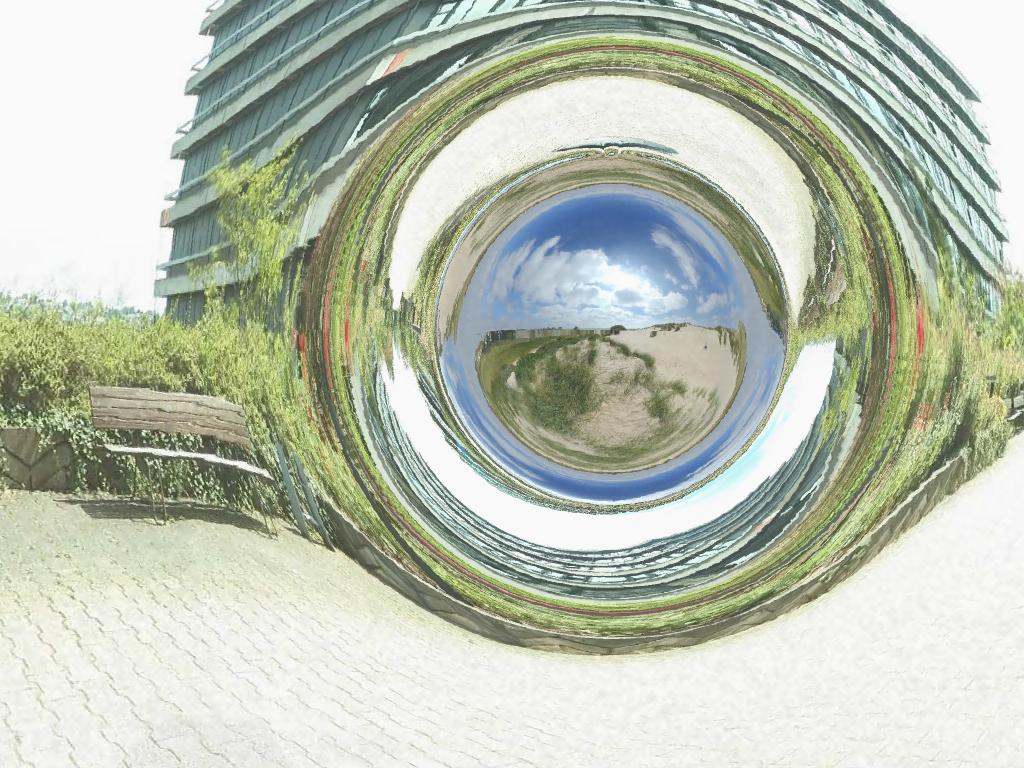
Image of a simulated traversable wormhole that connects the square in front of the physical institutes of University of Tübingen with the sand dunes near Boulogne-sur-Mer in the north of France. The image is calculated with 4D raytracing in a Morris–Thorne wormhole metric, but the gravitational effects on the wavelength of light have not been simulated. (Note: Other computer-rendered images and animations of traversable wormholes can be seen on this page by the creator of the image in the article, and this page has additional renderings.)

Lorentzian traversable wormholes would allow travel in both directions from one part of the universe to another part of that same universe very quickly or would allow travel from one universe to another. The possibility of traversable wormholes in general relativity was first demonstrated in a 1973 paper by Homer Ellis and independently in a 1973 paper by K. A. Bronnikov. Ellis analyzed the topology and the geodesics of the Ellis drainhole, showing it to be geodesically complete, horizonless, singularity-free, and fully traversable in both directions. The drainhole is a solution manifold of Einstein's field equations for a vacuum spacetime, modified by inclusion of a scalar field minimally coupled to the Ricci tensor with antiorthodox polarity (negative instead of positive). (Ellis specifically rejected referring to the scalar field as 'exotic' because of the antiorthodox coupling, finding arguments for doing so unpersuasive.) The solution depends on two parameters: m, which fixes the strength of its gravitational field, and n, which determines the curvature of its spatial cross sections. When m is set equal to 0, the drainhole's gravitational field vanishes. What is left is the Ellis wormhole, a nongravitating, purely geometric, traversable wormhole.

Kip Thorne and his graduate student Mike Morris independently discovered in 1988 the Ellis wormhole and argued for its use as a tool for teaching general relativity. For this reason, the type of traversable wormhole they proposed, held open by a spherical shell of exotic matter, is also known as a Morris–Thorne wormhole.

Later, other types of traversable wormholes were discovered as allowable solutions to the equations of general relativity, including a variety analyzed in a 1989 paper by Matt Visser, in which a path through the wormhole can be made where the traversing path does not pass through a region of exotic matter. In the pure Gauss–Bonnet gravity (a modification to general relativity involving extra spatial dimensions that is sometimes studied in the context of brane cosmology), however, exotic matter is not needed in order for wormholes to exist—they can exist even with no matter. A type held open by negative mass cosmic strings was put forth by Visser in collaboration with Cramer et al., in which it was proposed that such wormholes could have been naturally created in the early universe.

Wormholes connect two points in spacetime, which means that they would in principle allow travel in time, as well as in space. In 1988, Morris, Thorne and Yurtsever worked out how to convert a wormhole traversing space into one traversing time by accelerating one of its two mouths. According to general relativity, however, it would not be possible to use a wormhole to travel back to a time earlier than when the wormhole was first converted into a time "machine". Until this time it could not have been noticed or have been used.

== Raychaudhuri's theorem and exotic matter ==
To see why exotic matter is required, consider an incoming light front traveling along geodesics, which then crosses the wormhole and re-expands on the other side. The expansion goes from negative to positive. As the wormhole neck is of finite size, we would not expect caustics to develop, at least within the vicinity of the neck. According to the optical Raychaudhuri's theorem, this requires a violation of the averaged null energy condition. Quantum effects such as the Casimir effect cannot violate the averaged null energy condition in any neighborhood of space with zero curvature, but calculations in semiclassical gravity suggest that quantum effects may be able to violate this condition in curved spacetime. Although it was hoped recently that quantum effects could not violate an achronal version of the averaged null energy condition, violations have nevertheless been found, so it remains an open possibility that quantum effects might be used to support a wormhole.

== Modified general relativity ==
In some hypotheses where general relativity is modified, it is possible to have a wormhole that does not collapse without having to resort to exotic matter. For example, this is possible with R^{2} gravity, a form of f(R) gravity.

== Faster-than-light travel ==
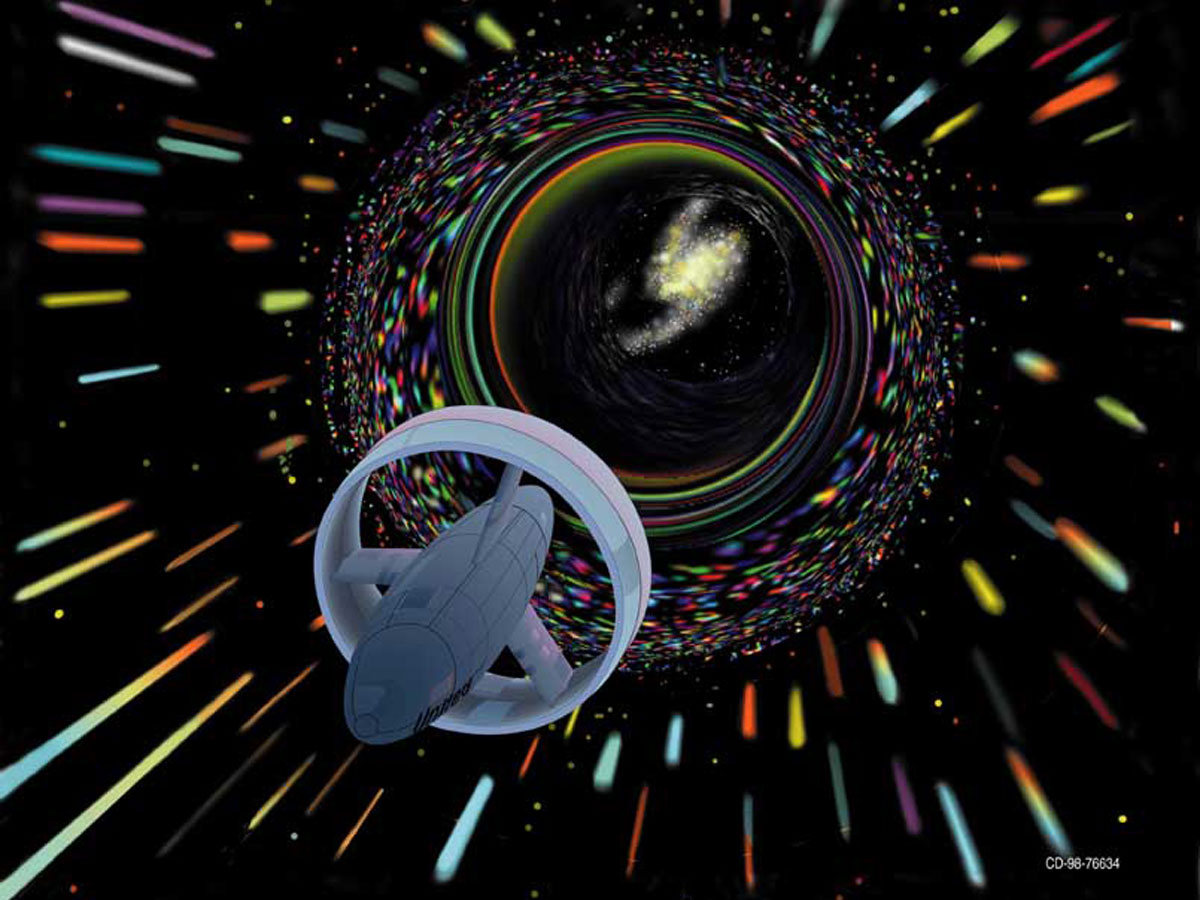
Wormhole travel as envisioned by Les Bossinas for NASA, c. 1998

The impossibility of faster-than-light relative speed applies only locally. Wormholes might allow effective superluminal (faster-than-light) travel by ensuring that the speed of light is not exceeded locally at any time. While traveling through a wormhole, subluminal (slower-than-light) speeds are used. If two points are connected by a wormhole whose length is shorter than the distance between them outside the wormhole, the time taken to traverse it could be less than the time it would take a light beam to make the journey if it took a path through the space outside the wormhole. A light beam traveling through the same wormhole would still beat the traveler.

== Time travel ==
If traversable wormholes exist, they might allow time travel. A proposed time-travel machine using a traversable wormhole might hypothetically work in the following way: One end of the wormhole is accelerated to some significant fraction of the speed of light, perhaps with some advanced propulsion system, and then brought back to the point of origin. Alternatively, another way is to take one entrance of the wormhole and move it to within the gravitational field of an object that has higher gravity than the other entrance, and then return it to a position near the other entrance. For both these methods, time dilation causes the end of the wormhole that has been moved to have aged less, or become "younger", than the stationary end as seen by an external observer; time connects differently through the wormhole than outside it, however, so that synchronized clocks at either end of the wormhole will always remain synchronized as seen by an observer passing through the wormhole, no matter how the two ends move around. This means that an observer entering the "younger" end would exit the "older" end at a time when it was the same age as the "younger" end, effectively going back in time as seen by an observer from the outside. One significant limitation of such a time machine is that it is only possible to go as far back in time as the initial creation of the machine; it is more of a path through time rather than it is a device that itself moves through time, and it would not allow the technology itself to be moved backward in time.

According to current theories on the nature of wormholes, construction of a traversable wormhole would require the existence of a substance with negative energy, often referred to as "exotic matter". More technically, the wormhole spacetime requires a distribution of energy that violates various energy conditions, such as the null energy condition along with the weak, strong, and dominant energy conditions. It is known that quantum effects can lead to small measurable violations of the null energy condition, and many physicists believe that the required negative energy may actually be possible due to the Casimir effect in quantum physics. Although early calculations suggested a very large amount of negative energy would be required, later calculations showed that the amount of negative energy can be made arbitrarily small.

In 1993, Matt Visser argued that the two mouths of a wormhole with such an induced clock difference could not be brought together without inducing quantum field and gravitational effects that would either make the wormhole collapse or the two mouths repel each other, or otherwise prevent information from passing through the wormhole. Because of this, the two mouths could not be brought close enough for causality violation to take place. In a 1997 paper, however, Visser hypothesized that a complex "Roman ring" (named after Tom Roman) configuration of an N number of wormholes arranged in a symmetric polygon could still act as a time machine, although he concludes that this is more likely a flaw in classical quantum gravity theory rather than proof that causality violation is possible.

== Interuniversal travel ==
A possible resolution to the paradoxes resulting from wormhole-enabled time travel rests on the many-worlds interpretation of quantum mechanics.

In 1991 David Deutsch showed that quantum theory is fully consistent (in the sense that the so-called density matrix can be made free of discontinuities) in spacetimes with closed timelike curves. Later, it was shown that such a model of closed timelike curves can have internal inconsistencies as it will lead to strange phenomena like distinguishing non-orthogonal quantum states and distinguishing proper and improper mixture. Accordingly, the destructive positive feedback loop of virtual particles circulating through a wormhole time machine, a result indicated by semi-classical calculations, is averted. A particle returning from the future does not return to its universe of origination but to a parallel universe. This suggests that a wormhole time machine with an exceedingly short time jump is a theoretical bridge between contemporaneous parallel universes.

Because a wormhole time-machine introduces a type of nonlinearity into quantum theory, this sort of communication between parallel universes is consistent with Joseph Polchinski's proposal of an Everett phone (named after Hugh Everett) in Steven Weinberg's formulation of nonlinear quantum mechanics.

The possibility of communication between parallel universes has been dubbed interuniversal travel.

Wormholes can also be depicted in a Penrose diagram of a Schwarzschild black hole. In the Penrose diagram, an object traveling faster than light will cross the black hole and will emerge from another end into a different space, time or universe. This will be an inter-universal wormhole.

== Metrics ==
Theories of wormhole metrics describe the spacetime geometry of a wormhole and serve as theoretical models for time travel. An example of a (traversable) wormhole metric is the following:

$ds^2= - c^2 \, dt^2 + d\ell^2 + (k^2 + \ell^2)(d \theta^2 + \sin^2 \theta \, d\varphi^2),$

first presented by Ellis (see Ellis wormhole) as a special case of the Ellis drainhole.

One type of non-traversable wormhole metric is the Schwarzschild solution (see the first diagram):

$ds^2= - c^2 \left(1 - \frac{2GM}{rc^2}\right) \, dt^2 + \frac{dr^2}{1 - \frac{2GM}{rc^2}} + r^2(d \theta^2 + \sin^2 \theta \, d\varphi^2).$

The original Einstein–Rosen bridge was described in an article published in July 1935.

For the Schwarzschild spherically symmetric static solution

$ds^2 = - \frac{1}{1 - \frac{2m}{r}} \, dr^2 - r^2(d\theta^2 + \sin^2 \theta \, d\varphi^2) + \left(1 - \frac{2m}{r} \right) \, dt^2,$

where $ds$ is the proper time and $c = 1$.

If one replaces $r$ with $u$ according to $u^2 = r - 2m$

$ds^2 = -4(u^2 + 2m)\,du^2 - (u^2 + 2m)^2(d\theta^2 + \sin^2 \theta \, d\varphi^2) + \frac{u^2}{u^2 + 2m} \, dt^2$

The four-dimensional space is described mathematically by two congruent parts or "sheets", corresponding to $u>0$ and $u< 0$, which are joined by a hyperplane $r = 2m$ or $u= 0$ in which $g$ vanishes. We call such a connection between the two sheets a "bridge".

— A. Einstein, N. Rosen, "The Particle Problem in the General Theory of Relativity"

For the combined field, gravity and electricity, Einstein and Rosen derived the following Schwarzschild static spherically symmetric solution

$\varphi_1 = \varphi_2 = \varphi_3 = 0, \varphi_4 = \frac{\varepsilon}{4},$
$ds^2 = - \frac{1}{\left( 1 - \frac{2m}{r} - \frac{\varepsilon^2}{2 r^2}\right)} \, dr^2 - r^2 (d\theta^2 + \sin^2 \theta \, d\varphi^2) + \left(1 - \frac{2m}{r} - \frac{\varepsilon^2}{2 r^2}\right) \, dt^2,$

where $\varepsilon$ is the electric charge.

The field equations without denominators in the case when $m = 0$ can be written

$\varphi_{\mu \nu} = \varphi_{\mu,\nu} - \varphi_{\nu,\mu}$
$g^2 \varphi_{\mu\nu;\sigma}g^{\nu\sigma} = 0$
$g^2 (R_{ik} + \varphi_{i\alpha}\varphi_k^\alpha - \frac{1}{4} g_{ik} \varphi_{\alpha\beta}\varphi^{\alpha\beta}) = 0$

In order to eliminate singularities, if one replaces $r$ by $u$ according to the equation:

$u^2 = r^2 - \frac{\varepsilon^2}{2}$

and with $m = 0$ one obtains

$\varphi_1 = \varphi_2 = \varphi_3 = 0$ and $\varphi_4 = \frac{\varepsilon}{\left( u^2 + \frac{\varepsilon^2}{2} \right)^{1/2}}$
$ds^2 = - du^2 - \left(u^2 + \frac{\varepsilon^2}{2}\right)(d \theta^2 + \sin^2 \theta \, d\varphi^2) + \left(\frac{2 u^2}{2 u^2 + \varepsilon^2}\right) \, dt^2$

The solution is free from singularities for all finite points in the space of the two sheets

— A. Einstein, N. Rosen, "The Particle Problem in the General Theory of Relativity"

== In fiction ==
Wormholes are a common element in science fiction because they allow interstellar, intergalactic, and sometimes even interuniversal travel within human lifetime scales. In fiction, wormholes have also served as a method for time travel.

=== Warp portals and higher-dimensional shortcuts ===
In theoretical physics and science fiction, the concept of a warp or warp portal is frequently used to describe shortcuts through space that are only possible by accessing a higher spatial dimension. Just as a two-dimensional space would require a third spatial dimension to bend or fold its plane in order to bring two distant points together, a three-dimensional space must be embedded within a fourth spatial dimension to allow similar manipulation. This analogy underlies many depictions of warp portals, which function by bending or folding three-dimensional space through the fourth spatial axis, allowing distant regions to become adjacent.

The existence of such a mechanism would imply that the universe possesses, or is embedded within, a four-dimensional spatial framework, even if that dimension is not directly observable. The geometry of these constructs is often modeled using solutions to Einstein's field equations, such as wormholes, and the Alcubierre warp bubble, both of which rely on higher-dimensional curvature.

== See also ==
- Alcubierre drive
- ER = EPR
- Gödel metric
- Krasnikov tube
- Non-orientable wormhole
- Novikov self-consistency principle
- Polchinski's paradox
- Retrocausality
- Ring singularity
- Roman ring
