= Exotic matter =

Physics term for multiple concepts

There are several proposed types of exotic matter:

- Hypothetical particles and states of matter that have not yet been encountered, but whose properties would be within the realm of mainstream physics if found to exist.
- Several particles whose existence has been experimentally confirmed that are conjectured to be exotic hadrons and within the Standard Model.
- States of matter that are not commonly encountered, such as Bose–Einstein condensates, fermionic condensates, nuclear matter, quantum spin liquid, string-net liquid, supercritical fluid, color-glass condensate, quark–gluon plasma, Rydberg matter, Rydberg polaron, photonic matter, Wigner crystal, superfluid and time crystal but whose properties are entirely within the realm of mainstream physics.
- Forms of matter that are poorly understood, such as dark matter and mirror matter.
- Ordinary matter that when placed under high pressure, may result in dramatic changes in its physical or chemical properties.
- Degenerate matter
- Exotic atoms

== Negative mass ==
Negative mass would possess some strange properties, such as accelerating in the direction opposite of applied force. Despite being inconsistent with the expected behavior of "normal" matter, negative mass is mathematically consistent and introduces no violation of conservation of momentum or energy. It is used in certain speculative theories, such as on the construction of artificial wormholes and the Alcubierre drive. The closest known real representative of such exotic matter is the region of pseudo-negative-pressure density produced by the Casimir effect.

== Imaginary mass ==
A hypothetical particle with imaginary rest mass would always travel faster than the speed of light. Such particles are called tachyons. There is no confirmed existence of tachyons.

$$E = \frac{mc^2}{\sqrt{1 - \frac{v^2}{c^2}}}$$

If the rest mass $m$ is imaginary, this implies that the denominator is imaginary because the total energy is observable and thus must be real. Therefore, the quantity under the square root must be negative, which can only happen if the speed $v$ is greater than the speed of light $c$.

As noted by Gregory Benford, special relativity implies that tachyons, if they existed, could be used to communicate backwards in time (see tachyonic antitelephone). Because time travel is considered to be non-physical, tachyons are believed by physicists either not to exist, or else to be incapable of interacting with normal matter.

In quantum field theory, complex mass would induce tachyon condensation.

== Materials at high pressure ==
At extremely high pressure, materials such as sodium chloride (NaCl) in the presence of an excess of either chlorine or sodium were transformed into compounds "forbidden" by classical chemistry, such as Na_{3}Cl and NaCl_{3}. Quantum mechanical calculations predict the possibility of other compounds, such as NaCl_{7}, Na_{3}Cl_{2} and Na_{2}Cl. The materials are thermodynamically stable at high pressures. Such compounds may exist in natural environments that exist at high pressure, such as the deep ocean or inside planetary cores. The materials have potentially useful properties. For instance, Na_{3}Cl is a two-dimensional metal, made of layers of pure sodium and salt that can conduct electricity. The salt layers act as insulators while the sodium layers act as conductors.

== See also ==
- Antimatter – Material composed of antiparticles
- Dark energy – Energy driving the accelerated expansion of the universe
- Dark matter – Hypothetical invisible cosmic material
- Gravitational interaction of antimatter – Theory of gravity on antimatter
- Mirror matter – Hypothetical counterpart to ordinary matter
- Negative energy – Concept in physics
- Negative mass – Concept in physical models
- QCD matter – Hypothetical phases of matter
- Strange matter – Degenerate matter made from strange quarks
