= Daktari: A Surgeon's Adventures with the Flying Doctors of East Africa =

2011 book by Thomas D. Rees

- Author: Thomas D. Rees
- Language: English
- Genre: Non-fiction
- Publication date: 2002
- ISBN: 978-0-865-34389-4

Daktari: A Surgeon's Adventure's with the Flying Doctors of East Africa is a non-fiction book by Dr. Thomas D. Rees. It details the author's exploits providing plastic surgery and other medical assistance to remote areas of Africa starting in 1957. Rees was one of three co-founders of Amref Health Africa, previously known as the Flying Doctors of East Africa, along with Sir Archibald McIndoe and Sir Michael Wood.
