= Leonore Semler =

Founder of Amref Health Africa - Germany (1921–2016)

- Born: 19 March 1921; Hanover, Germany
- Died: 19 October 2016 (aged 95); Munich, Germany
- Occupation: Philanthropist
- Known for: Founding: African Medical and Research Foundation (AMREF) in Germany
- Spouse: Johannes Semler
- Children: Reni and Michael

Leonore Semler (19 March 1921, in Hanover – 19 October 2016, in Munich) was a German philanthropist and founder in 1963 of the German branch of the African Medical and Research Foundation (now known as Amref Health Africa). She headed the organization until 2009 and raised millions of euros on its behalf.

== Life ==
Leonore Semler was the wife of a prominent European Community politician Dr. Johannes Semler in 1963, when she met Sir Michael Wood, founder of Amref Health Africa, who had traveled from Africa to Europe to raise funds for the organization dedicated to improving access to health care for Africans. On that trip, he met Leonore Semler and convinced her to start an office in Germany to represent the work of Amref. She did so and immediately began raising funds to support its work. Within days, with help from Prince Konstantin of Bavaria, she recorded its first donation of DM10,000. In the following weeks she convinced Walter Scheel, who was then Germany's Minister for Foreign Affairs and later President, to donate the salary of a surgeon and pediatrician. Then he gave the group an airplane so the group's Flying Doctors of East Africa could pursue their mission.

For decades, Semler raised funds for Amref on a voluntary basis. After 14 years, she had amassed DM 3 million in donations – from the Federal Ministry of Economic Cooperation, churches and other organizations. Over her 50 years of service, she promoted Amref's work and that of the Amref Flying Doctors throughout Germany and Europe.

Until 2009, Semler was the board chair of Amref – Germany, and when she retired from the board, she was named its honorary president. She also served as an Honorary Director of Amref’s International Board of Directors.

Semler, died 19 October 2016 at her Munich home at the age of 95, survived by her two children. At the time, Amref's CEO, Githinji Gitahi, said, "she will be remembered in Germany and across all of Amref globally with fond affection and deep respect for her tireless support and dedication to Amref and the people of Africa."

== Honors ==
Semler was recognized by the German Government for her work, receiving the Order of Merit of the Federal Republic of Germany.
