= Sir Martin Wood Prize =

Condensed matter science prize presented in Japan

- Country: United Kingdom
- Presented by: Oxford Instruments
- Reward: JPY 500,000
- First award: 1999
- Website: Millennium Science Forum

The Sir Martin Wood Prize is an annually presented condensed matter science prize presented in honor of Sir Martin Wood. Due to Wood's connection with and reputation in Japan, the award is given to a young scientist in Japan under the age of 45 to promote scientific exchange between Japan and Britain. Condensed matter physics, inorganic-organic chemistry, material science and surface-interface physics are eligible fields under condensed matter science. Sponsored by Oxford Instruments, the company Wood co-founded, the award comes with a cash prize of JPY 500,000 and opportunities to give invited lectures at universities in the United Kingdom.

== Laureates ==
Year	Laureate	Affiliation	Citation
1999	Yasunobu Nakamura (中村 泰信)	NEC Fundamental and Environmental Research Laboratories	"Quantum coherence in single-electron-pair box."
2000	Tokushi Kizuka (清水克哉)	Nagoya University	"Atomic direct observation of structural dynamics in solid."
2000	Katsuya Shimizu (木塚 徳志)	Osaka University	"Search for superconductivity under ultra-high pressure."
2001	Keiya Shirahama (白濱 圭也)	Keio University	"Experimental study of the transport phenomena in the Wigner crystal phase of electrons on super fluid 3He."
2002	Ichiro Terasaki (寺崎 一郎)	Waseda University	"Search for a novel physical property in transition-metal oxides."
2003	Toshimasa Fujisawa (藤澤 利正)	NTT Basic Research Laboratories	"Study of single-electron dynamics in quantum dot."
2004	Yuzo Ohno (大野 裕三)	Tohoku University Research Institute of Electrical Communication	"Spin injection and electron spin/nuclear spin dynamics in semiconductors."
2005	Tsuyoshi Kimura (木村 剛)	Lucent Technologies, Bell Laboratories	"Discovery of colossal response to magnetic field in manganese oxides."
2006	Kazutomo Suenaga (末永 和知)	National Institute of Advanced Industrial Science and Technology	"Electron microscopy and spectroscopy on single molecules."
2007	Akira Ohtomo (大友 明)	Tohoku University Institute for Materials Research	"High mobility electron gas at polar oxide heterointerfaces."
2008	Teruo Ono (小野 輝男)	Kyoto University	"Magnetization control in nano-magnets by electric currents."
2008	Eiji Saitoh (齊藤 英治)	Keio University	"Generation, detection and utilization of spin currents."
2009	Yousoo Kim (金 有洙)	RIKEN	"Spectroscopy and reaction-control of a single molecule at surfaces."
2010	Shuichi Murakami (村上 修一)	Tokyo Institute of Technology	"Theory of the Spin Hall effect."
2011	Yukio Kawano (河野 行雄)	Tokyo Institute of Technology	"Terahertz wave detection"
2012	Daichi Chiba (千葉 大地)	Kyoto University	"Electric-field control of ferromagnetism in semiconductors and metals."
2013	Naoya Shibata (柴田 直哉)	University of Tokyo	"Development of an advanced scanning transmission electron microscope for material science research."
2014	Masamitsu Hayashi (林 将光)	National Institute for Materials Science	"Effective field measurements and spin torque dynamics in magnetic nanostructures."
2015	Takuya Satoh (佐藤 琢哉)	Kyushu University	"Generation and control of magnetic excitations by polarized light in antiferromagnets and ferrimagnets."
2016	Akihito Ishizaki (石﨑 章仁)	Institute for Molecular Science	"Theoretical development of real-time quantum dissipative dynamics and its application to molecular systems."
2017	Michihisa Yamamoto (山本 倫久)	University of Tokyo	"Control and detection of quantum phase in semiconductor nanostructures."
2018	Yoshihiko Okamoto (岡本 佳比古)	Nagoya University	"Creation of functional electronic phases."
2019	Keiichi Inoue (井上 圭一)	University of Tokyo	"Discovery and functional analysis of novel retinal proteins."
2020	Takeshi Kondo (近藤 猛)	University of Tokyo	"Identification of electronic states of high-temperature copper oxide superconductors by advanced angle-resolved photoemissions spectroscopy."
2021	Atsushi Togo (東後 篤史)	National Institute for Materials Science	"Development of open source software for phonon properties in materials science."
2022	Shunichiro Watanabe (渡邉 峻一郎)	University of Tokyo	"Creation of crystalline organic and polymeric semiconductors with excellent charge and spin transport properties."
2023	Genki Kobayashi (小林 玄器)	RIKEN	"Creation of hydride super-ionic conductors."
2024	Kosuke Yoshioka (吉岡 孝高)	University of Tokyo	"Realisation of Bose-Einstein condensation of excitons."
2024	Emi Minamitani (南谷 英美)	Osaka University	"Correlation between nanostructures and transport properties in inhomogeneous condensed systems."
2025	Takamasa Sakai (酒井 崇匡)	University of Tokyo	"Innovation of gel science based on the creation of homogeneous gels."

== See also ==
- List of physics awards
- List of awards named after people
