= Jesús Manuel Muñoz Tejeda =

- Born: Madrid, Spain
- Education: Technical University of Madrid (BEng); Charles III University of Madrid (MSc); Delft University of Technology (MSc); Imperial College London (PhD)
- Scientific career
- Fields: Spacecraft propulsion Electric propulsion Electrodynamic tethers Space debris mitigation
- Workplaces: Imperial College London; European Space Agency; NASA Jet Propulsion Laboratory; Stanford University; CERN
- Thesis: Water-fuelled space propulsion systems
- Doctoral advisor: Aaron Knoll

Jesús Manuel Muñoz Tejeda is a Spanish aerospace researcher specialising in space sustainability and orbital debris mitigation. He is the co-founder of PERSEI Space, selected by the European Space Agency (ESA) for the Flight Ticket Initiative to conduct a in-orbit demonstration of electrodynamic tether technology. His work focuses on Hall-effect thrusters, electric propulsion, and electrodynamic tether systems.

== Early life and education ==
Muñoz Tejeda was born in Madrid, Spain. He received a bachelor's degree in aerospace engineering from the Universidad Politécnica de Madrid (UPM), followed by a joint Master of Science in aerospace engineering from Universidad Carlos III de Madrid (UC3M) and the Delft University of Technology (TU Delft).

Before his doctoral studies, he conducted research at the CERN particle physics laboratory in Switzerland and at the Swiss Space Center. He subsequently completed research visits to Stanford University and the NASA Jet Propulsion Laboratory. He completed his PhD in the Department of Aeronautics at Imperial College London, focusing on water-fuelled electric propulsion. In 2024, Muñoz Tejeda received Imperial College London's Zero Pollution Pioneer Award in recognition of his doctoral work on water as a propellant for Hall-effect thrusters.

== Career ==
In September 2023, Muñoz Tejeda co-founded PERSEI Space as a spin-off of UC3M together with aerospace engineering professors Gonzalo Sánchez-Arriaga and Manuel Sanjurjo-Rivo, with principal investigators from TU Dresden and the University of Padua. The company develops electrodynamic tether technology for propellant-free satellite deorbiting and in-orbit servicing.

In 2024, PERSEI Space was selected for an in-orbit demonstration of electrodynamic tether technology for the ESA Flight Ticket Initiative.

In 2026, PERSEI Space received the ESA First Sustainability Award at ESA headquarters in Paris during the FLPP Spring Session. Also, in 2026, PERSEI Space was awarded the Premios EmprendeXXI (EmprendeXXI Awards) in the Community of Madrid, granted by CaixaBank and Empresa Nacional de Innovación (ENISA).

== Research ==
At the Imperial Plasma Propulsion Laboratory (IPPL) at Imperial College London, Muñoz Tejeda's research focused on the use of water and its electrolysis products, hydrogen and oxygen, as propellants for Hall-effect thrusters, as an alternative to conventional xenon and krypton propellants.

In 2021, Muñoz Tejeda led DZH Dynamics (named after the Dzhanibekov effect), an ESA-selected Fly Your Thesis! team, in experiments on the Dzhanibekov effect during the 77th ESA Parabolic Flight Campaign. The effect is a rotational instability relevant to spacecraft attitude control, particularly for vehicles with variable inertia.

In 2025, he developed a particle-in-cell computational model of water-fuelled Hall thrusters that could use in-situ-sourced water as a propellant for deep space missions.

== Selected publications ==
- Muñoz Tejeda, J. M.; et al. (2025). "Experimental demonstration of a second-generation water electrolysis Hall Effect Thruster (AQUAHET)". Acta Astronautica. 236. doi:10.1016/j.actaastro.2025.06.041.
- Muñoz Tejeda, J. M.; Perales-Díaz, J.; Knoll, A. (2025). "Computational modelling of water-fuelled Hall Effect Thrusters". Journal of Electric Propulsion. 4 (1): 27. doi:10.1007/s44205-025-00124-2.
- Castro-Fernández, I.; Muñoz Tejeda, J. M.; et al. (2025). "An energy- and time-efficient attitude determination and control system for inertia-morphing spacecraft using the Dzhanibekov effect". Multibody System Dynamics. doi:10.1007/s11044-025-10065-1.
- Muñoz Tejeda, J. M.; et al. (2024). "Experimental demonstration of a water electrolysis Hall Effect Thruster operating with a hydrogen cathode". Acta Astronautica. 219: 542–554.
- Muñoz Tejeda, J. M.; Knoll, A. (2023). "A water vapour fuelled Hall Effect Thruster: Characterization and comparison with oxygen". Acta Astronautica. 211: 702–715. doi:10.1016/j.actaastro.2023.06.010.
- Muñoz Tejeda, J. M.; Reza, M.; Faraji, F.; Knoll, A. (2022). "Performance enhancement of Hall Effect Thrusters using radiofrequency excitation". Acta Astronautica. 194: 145–161. doi:10.1016/j.actaastro.2022.01.033. hdl:10044/1/94857.
