= Farm Africa =

UK-based agricultural aid organization operating in eastern Africa

Farm Africa is a UK-based charitable organization set up in 1985 that works with farmers, pastoralists and forest communities in eastern Africa. The charity promotes sustainable agricultural practices, strengthens markets and protects the environment in rural Africa. Farm Africa has offices in the United Kingdom, Kenya, Tanzania, Ethiopia and Uganda.

Farm Africa was founded in 1985 by Sir Michael Wood (1918–1987), a doctor who had co-founded the African Medical and Research Foundation (Amref), and David Campbell, an agriculturalist. Campbell served as executive director until 1999, when he was succeeded by Dr Christie Peacock, who joined the charity in 1988. The charity's Chief Executive is Dan Collison, its chair is John Reizenstein and its president is Sir Martin Wood, brother of the co-founder.

== Locations ==
The charity works in the following locations:

- Kenya
  - Meru County
  - Isiolo
  - Mwingi
  - Kitui
  - Marsabit
  - Moyale
  - Kakamega
  - Busia County
  - Homa Bay
  - Siaya County
  - Vihiga County
  - Trans-Nzoia County
  - Embu County
- Ethiopia
  - Debub Omo Zone
  - Bonga Forest
  - Chilimo
  - Borena Zone
  - South Omo Zone
  - Bale Zone
  - South Wollo Zone
  - Oromia Zone
  - Benishangul-Gumuz
- Tanzania
  - Babati
  - Mbulu
  - Hanang
  - Dodoma
- Uganda
  - Mbale
  - Sironko
  - Kanungu District
  - Lira District
  - Karamoja
- Democratic Republic of the Congo
  - Virunga National Park
