= Yasunobu Nakamura =

Japanese physicist

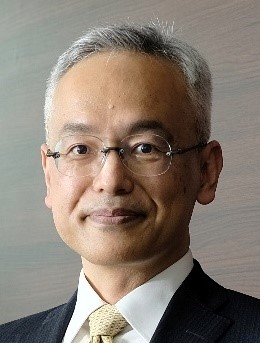
- Born: 2 February 1968 (age 58); Osaka, Japan
- Education: University of Tokyo (Ph.D.)
- Known for: Work with "hybrid quantum information systems"; First demonstration of coherent control of a Cooper pair box-based superconducting charge qubit
- Awards: Micius Quantum Prize 2021
- Scientific career
- Fields: Quantum information science, Superconducting quantum computing

Yasunobu Nakamura (中村 泰信, Nakamura Yasunobu; born 2 February 1968) is a Japanese physicist. He is a professor at the University of Tokyo's Research Center for Advanced Science and Technology (RCAST) and the Principal Investigator of the Superconducting Quantum Electronics Research Group (SQERG) at the Center for Emergent Matter Science (CEMS) within RIKEN. He has contributed primarily to the area of quantum information science, particularly in superconducting quantum computing and hybrid quantum systems.

== Education and early work ==
Yasunobu Nakamura was born on 2 February 1968 in Osaka. While a child, Nakamura's family moved from Osaka to Hinode, Tokyo, where he would gain his early education. He obtained his Bachelor of Science (1990), Master of Science (1992), and Ph.D. (2011) degrees at the University of Tokyo. In 1999, as a researcher at NEC, Nakamura and collaborators Yuri Pashkin and Jaw-Shen Tsai demonstrated "electrical coherent control of a qubit in a solid-state electronic device" and in 2001 "realized the first measurement of the Rabi oscillations associated with the transition between two Josephson levels in the Cooper pair box" in a configuration developed by Michel Devoret and colleagues in 1998.

In 2000, Nakamura was featured as a "Younger Scientist" by the Japan Society of Applied Physics for his work at NEC in "quantum-state control of nanoscale superconducting devices." From 2001-2002, he visited the group of Hans Mooij at TU Delft on a sabbatical from NEC, where he worked with Irinel Chiorescu, Kees Harmans, and Mooij to create the first flux qubit. In 2003, he was named one of MIT Technology Review's top innovators under 35 years old, in which editors noted that "Nakamura and a collaborator got two qubits to interact in a manner that had been predicted but never demonstrated" at the time.

== Current work ==
As of 3 October 2016, the Japan Science and Technology Agency (科学技術振興機構) announced funding for Nakamura's work through their Exploratory Research for Advanced Technology (ERATO) program. The project, entitled Macroscopic Quantum Machines, seeks to dramatically improve quantum state control technology to further the field of quantum computing. Of principal focus is the development of a highly scalable platform for implementing quantum information processing techniques, as well as the creation of hybrid quantum systems which interface with microwave quantum optics. In an article in Nikkei Science in 2018, it was announced that work towards the construction of a quantum computer with 100 superconducting qubits was underway. In 2019, the Japanese Ministry of Education, Culture, Sports, Science and Technology launched a quantum technology project known as QLEAP, with Nakamura as the team leader for the quantum information processing component. The project aims to develop superconducting quantum computers and other quantum technologies over a ten-year period, by increasing collaboration between academia and industry.

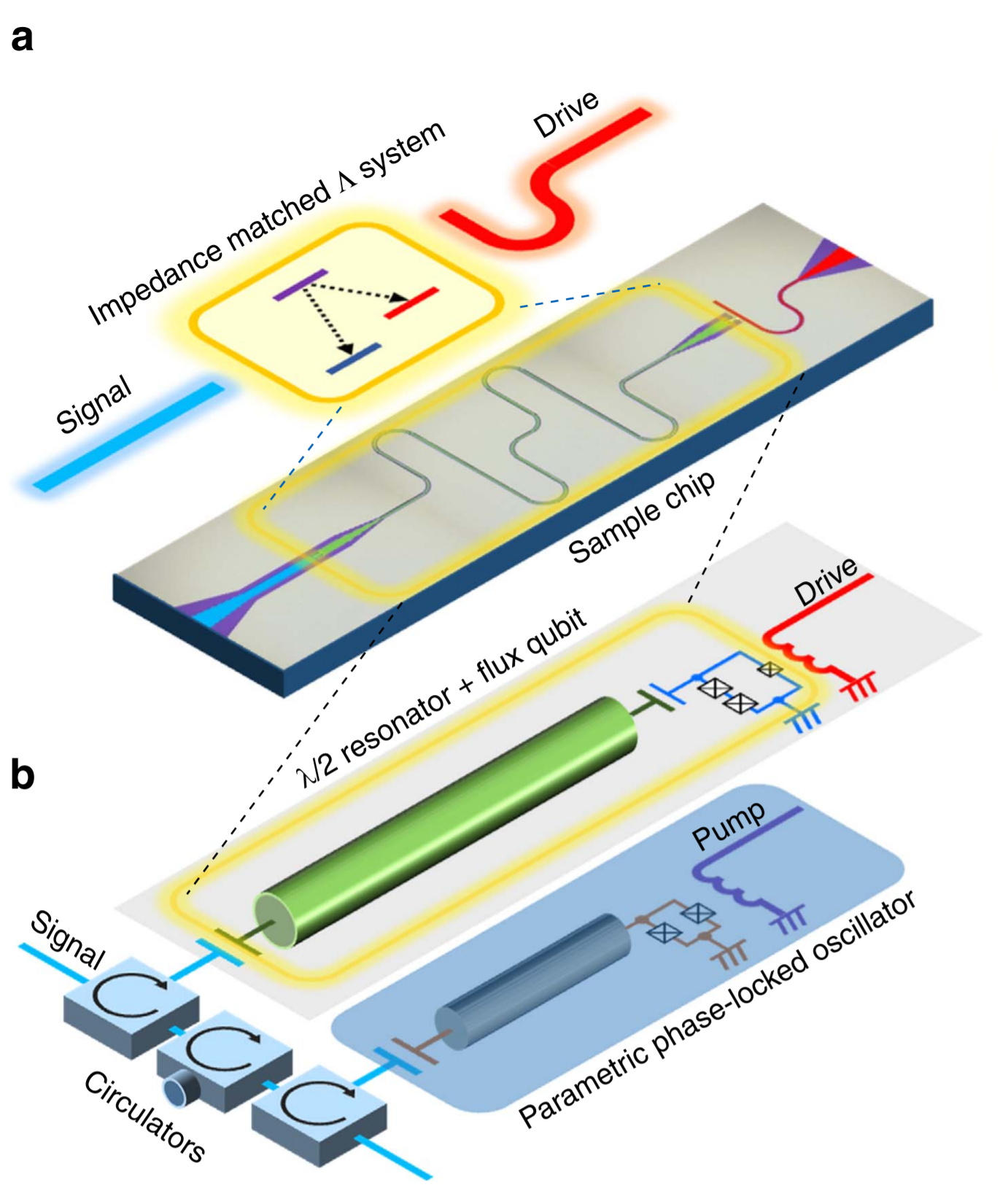
A flux qubit and superconducting microwave cavity form a coupled system that connects to a parametric phase-locked oscillator. In the paper "Single microwave-photon detector using an artificial Λ-type three-level system" published in Nature Communications in 2016, Nakamura and collaborators manipulated this three-level system in such a way that single photons were detected with an "efficiency of 0.66±0.06 with a low dark-count probability of 0.014±0.001 and a reset time of ~400 ns."

In past years, Nakamura and collaborators have published their findings on the efficient detection of single microwave frequency photons, the suppression of quasiparticles in superconducting quantum computing environments for the improvement of qubit coherence times, the development of "a deterministic scheme to generate maximal entanglement between remote superconducting atoms, using a propagating microwave photon as a flying qubit", and the realization of a hybrid quantum system by the strong, coherent coupling between a collective magnetic mode of a ferromagnetic sphere and a superconducting qubit.

More recently, results have been published in which superconducting qubits were used to resolve quanta of magnon number states, to create a quantitatively non-classical photon number distribution, to measure fluctuations in a surface acoustic wave (SAW) resonator, and to measure an itinerant microwave photon in a quantum nondemolition (QND) detection experiment. A superconducting circuit was later used to realize information-to-work conversion by a Maxwell's demon, radio waves and optical light were optomechanically coupled to surface acoustic waves, and an ordered vortex lattice in a Josephson junction array was observed.

Nakamura has spoken several times at quantum information science conferences and seminars, including at the University of Vienna, the Institute for Theoretical Atomic Molecular and Optical Physics at Harvard University, the National Center of Competence in Research's Quantum Science and Technology Monte Verità conference, the Institute for Quantum Computing at the University of Waterloo, the Institute for Molecular Engineering at the University of Chicago the Institute for Quantum Optics and Quantum Information (IQOQI), and the Yale Quantum Institute at Yale University.

In 2020, Nakamura was named as a fellow of the American Physical Society for "the first demonstration of coherent time-dependent manipulation of superconducting qubits, and for contributions to the development of superconducting quantum circuits, microwave quantum optics, and hybrid quantum systems".

== Honors and awards ==
- 1999: Young Investigator Award, Japan Society of Applied Physics
- 1999: The 1st Sir Martin Wood Prize, Millennium Science Forum
- 1999: The 45th Nishina Memorial Prize
- 2003: TR100, MIT Technology Review
- 2004: Agilent Technologies Europhysics Prize (with Michel Devoret, Daniel Esteve, and Hans Mooij)
- 2008: Simon Memorial Prize (with Jaw-Shen Tsai)
- 2014: The 11th Leo Esaki Prize (with Jaw-Shen Tsai)
- 2018: The 19th JSAP Outstanding Achievement Award
- 2020: American Physical Society (APS) Fellow
- 2021: Micius Quantum Prize
- 2023: Japan Academy Prize
- 2024: Asian Scientist 100, Asian Scientist
