= Ndirangu Wanjuki =

Kenyan physician (born 1970)

- Born: Meshack Ndirangu Wanjuki; 1970 (age 55–56); Kenya
- Education: University of Nairobi; Jomo Kenyatta University of Agriculture and Technology; Moi University; The Academy of Executive Coaching
- Occupations: Leader, Physician, Coach
- Employer: Amref Health Africa (2005–present)
- Known for: Public Health
- Notable work: Country Director at Amref Health Africa
- Title: Country Director

Meshack Ndirangu Wanjuki (born 1970), is a Kenyan physician, public health leader and certified coach.

Since August 2015, Ndirangu serves as the Kenya country director of Amref Health Africa, a global organization founded in 1957 with its headquarters located in Nairobi, Kenya. The organization is the owner of Amref International University. Prior to his promotion, Ndirangu was Kenya deputy country director at the same organization since 2011.

Ndirangu have been serving continuously for 18 years in different positions at the Amref Health Africa since 2005. Prior to joining, he served as medical officer for Kenyan Ministry of Health at, Rift Valley Provincial Hospital in Nakuru county between November 1996 and October 1998, and Lodwar District Hospital in Turkana County between 1998 and 2002. He also served for 2-year term at International Committee of the Red Cross in Kenya as medical consultant from January 2001 to December 2002. As a physician working for public health institutions, Ndirangu coordinated various programs in Kenya aimed at strengthening health systems to improve public health by controlling communicable and non-communicable diseases such as Malaria, Diabetes, obstetric fistula, Hepatitis B, and HIV/AIDS, and reducing maternal and child deaths.

== Early life and education ==
Ndirangu was born in 1970; he grew up and completed his elementary and secondary education in Kenya. Between 1989 and 1996, Ndirangu attended University of Nairobi, in Kenya, he graduated with Bachelor of Medicine and Bachelor of Surgery. In 2002, he enrolled in Moi University in Kenya to pursue a postgraduate degree, and he earned Master's of Science in Public Health (Epidemiology and Disease Control) there in 2005. Later in 2008, Ndirangu also enrolled in Jomo Kenyatta University of Agriculture and Technology for another postgraduate degree in Business Administration, where he graduated with executive master's in business administration in 2009. In 2014, Ndirangu also enrolled in the UK Academy of Executive Coaching and earned a practitioner diploma in executive coaching.

== Career ==
In 1996 after graduating with Bachelor of Medicine and Bachelor of Surgery, Ndirangu joined the Kenyan Ministry of Health as medical officer intern at Rift Valley Provincial Hospital in Nakuru county. In 1998, subsequently, he was appointed as medical officer at Lodwar District Hospital in Turkana County until 2002. In addition, he worked at International Committee of the Red Cross in Kenya as medical consultant between January 2001 and December 2002.

In October 2005, Ngirangu first joined Amref Health Africa for a 2-year term contract as project manager of Busia Child Survival Project (BCSP). Project aimed a sustained reduction in child and maternal mortality in Funyula and Butula Divisions of Busia District in Kenya, it was implemented between 2005 and 2010 on partnership between Amref Health Africa, USAID, and Kenyan Government. He held this position until September 2007. In October of same year, Ndirangu was promoted to become program director of Maanisha HIV & AIDS Community Focused Initiatives, Amref's then-largest program aimed to control HIV/AIDS throughout Kenya. He served for 3 years until his appointment as Kenya deputy country director at the same organization in January 2011, the position he held until his promotion to become Kenya country director of the Amref Health Africa in August 2015. Ndirangu also dedicates his time in serving as an executive coach, he is the co-founder of Africa Coachlinks Africa, and co-author of Career Choice Book with Sheila Macharia, Njeri Gitau, Janice Njoroge and Sophie Ndungi-Mwangi, a career guidance book targeting African Students. In 2026, he authored the novel Sweet Lies: A Tale of Sugar, Deceit and Triumph (Longhorn Publishers), which follows Maria, a Nairobi professional nearing 37, as she explores sugar, the food environment and her family's health across three generations.

== See also ==
- Amref Health Africa
