= Heliox (cryogenic equipment) =

Heliox is a cryogenically cooled system produced by Oxford Instruments.

Presently available in 2 varieties, the VL and TL, vertically loaded and top-loaded respectively. They are both pumped ^{3}He cryostats, the TL capable of magnetic fields of up to 14 T, and the VL capable of achieving magnetic fields of up to 2 T. The base temperature for both systems is ~250 mK. Whilst the basis of operation of system is pumping of liquid helium-3 below 2.2 K, this low temperature is achieved by first cooling the system to 2.2 K by pumping of helium-4. A constant supply of liquid ^{4}He is necessary, constituting a typical overhead of ~£1 / liter, whilst ^{3}He is efficiently conserved as it is valued at ~£300 / liter.
