= Field propulsion =

Propulsion concepts and technologies

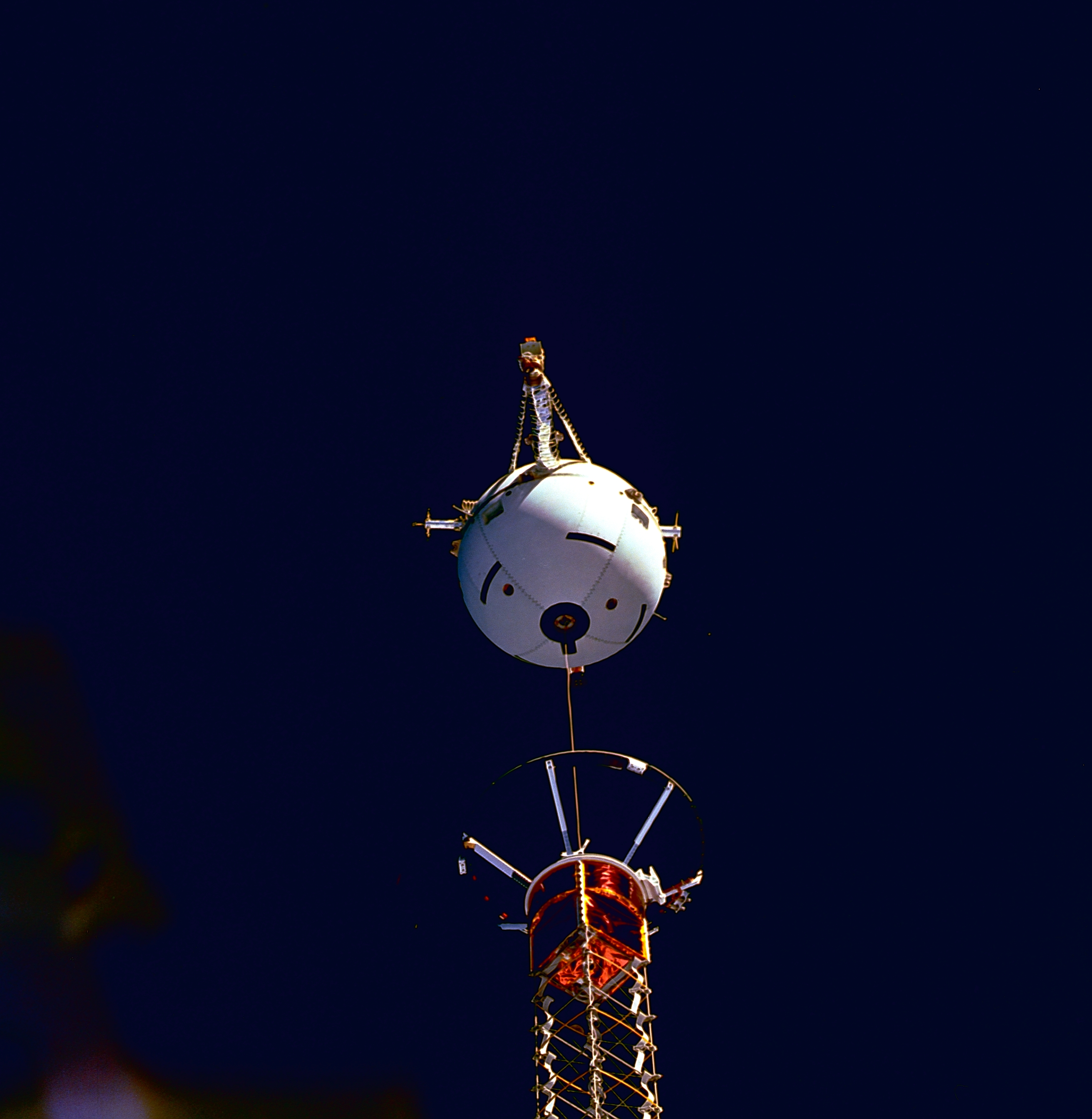
Deployment of the tethered satellite system during STS-75 in 1996.

Field propulsion refers to spacecraft propulsion concepts in which thrust arises from interactions with external fields or ambient media, rather than primarily from onboard chemical propellant. (Note: Myrabo's NASA contractor report also used field propulsion as a category heading in a taxonomy that grouped concepts under thermal, field, and photon headings. NASA's later small-spacecraft survey uses the narrower label propellant-less propulsion systems for systems that "generate thrust via interaction with the surrounding environment".) Early ideas grew from studies of radiation pressure and electrically driven motion; later contractor and agency surveys organized advanced concepts under thermal, field, and photon headings. Several related propulsion systems discussed alongside field propulsion in the broader historical literature surveyed here have since been demonstrated in practice, including electrodynamic tethers in orbit, and applications such as EHD thrust devices. In narrower modern literature, related propellant-less propulsion discussions often focus on environment-coupled systems, while the historical contractor and survey literature treated field propulsion more broadly and sometimes grouped related terrestrial electromagnetic propulsion and some beamed-energy concepts within the same analytical framework.

Related research has also examined beamed-energy propulsion, in which lasers, microwaves, or particle beams transmit power to a vehicle from a remote source, and more speculative proposals involving spacetime curvature. NASA's Breakthrough Propulsion Physics Program helped reframe the subject around conservation-law consistency, identifiable coupling mechanisms, and experimental reproducibility. Any claimed propulsion method that produces net thrust in a closed system without external interaction would violate conservation of momentum, which follows from the spatial translation symmetry of physical law as expressed by Noether's theorem.

Field propulsion concepts have appeared extensively in science fiction, in many cases predating or paralleling the technical research. The influence has occasionally been direct: physicist Miguel Alcubierre said that his warp metric was inspired by Star Trek terminology.

== Background and history ==
Traditional rocketry has dominated aerospace propulsion in the 20th and early 21st centuries. Conventional rockets achieve motion by expelling mass, most commonly the combustion output from chemical propellants to generate thrust via Newton's third law, which is the familiar rocket launch with explosive flame and smoke beneath it. In this article, field propulsion is used for propulsion system concepts in which thrust arises from interactions with external fields or ambient media, rather than primarily from onboard chemical propellant, while noting that some later sources instead use the narrower label propellant-less propulsion for environment-coupled systems. In the historical survey literature, however, the category was often drawn more broadly, extending to related externally powered and terrestrial electromagnetic concepts discussed within the same analytical family.

While many proposals had remained theoretical, certain environment-coupled systems were eventually demonstrated in space, including magnetic sails, and electrodynamic tethers, which couple with external photon, plasma, or magnetic fields instead of expelling onboard propellant. Field propulsion is not a single technology but a spectrum of approaches, ranging from mature concepts that have been tested in flight to highly speculative theoretical constructs.

=== Pre-20th century to the 1910s ===
James Clerk Maxwell demonstrated in 1873 that electromagnetic radiation should be able to create pressure on physical surfaces. At the International Congress of Physics in 1900, Pyotr Lebedev presented Les forces de Maxwell-Bartoli dues à la pression de la lumière, reporting experimental measurements of radiation pressure and providing the first quantitative confirmation of Maxwell's predictions with evidence that light exerts pressure on matter. By 1905, Albert Einstein had quantized Maxwell's findings to prove light particles could possess momentum.

=== 1920s-1950s ===
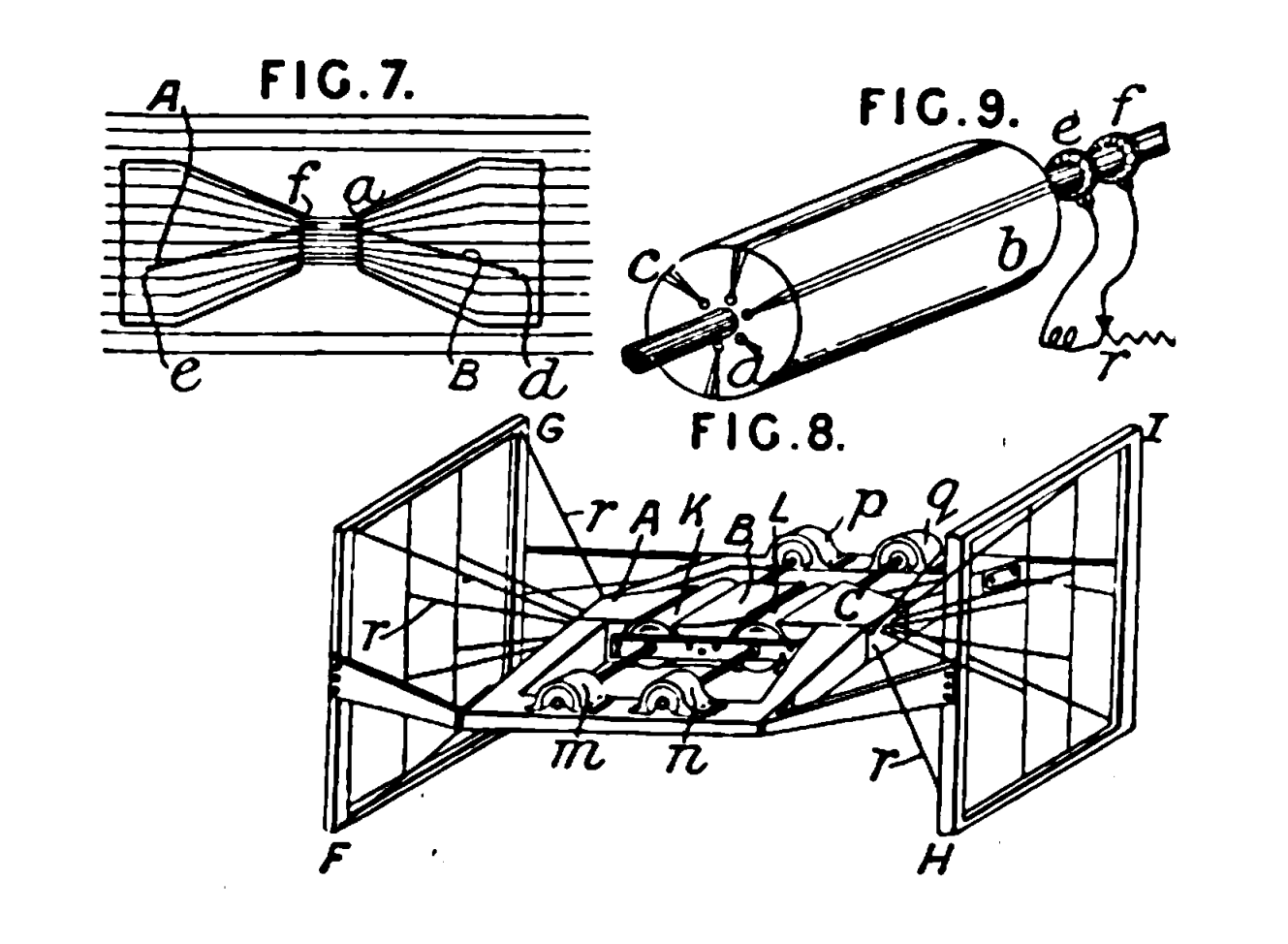
Dynamo-electric machines, an early 1928 patent related to field propulsion.

In 1921, Tsiolkovsky published Extension of Man into Outer Space, further exploring photon-based propulsion concepts. Перелеты на другие планеты (Flights to Other Planets) by Friedrich Zander was published in 1924 in Техника и жизнь, a Russian science journal, describing concepts to achieve interplanetary flight by use of light-propelled "screens made of extremely thin sheets". Zander was reportedly inspired in this work by his colleague Tsiolkovsky's own research on the topic.

Between 1928 and 1932, Nikolai Rynin published Mezhplanetnye Soobshcheniya (Interplanetary Flight and Communication), a nine-volume Russian-language encyclopedia that the National Air and Space Museum described as the first encyclopedia on the history and theory of aerospace technology and spaceflight. Its coverage included radiation-pressure propulsion and beamed-energy concepts, and the work of Lebedev, Tsiolkovsky, Goddard, Hermann Oberth, and Robert Esnault-Pelterie. Rynin's first volume, Dreams, legends, and early fantasies (1928), organized spacecraft energy sources into three categories: energy transmitted from Earth to the vehicle, energy carried onboard, and energy derived from outer space; the last including "radiation pressure to bear on special large screens around the vehicle," an explicit description of photon-pressure propulsion. Rynin observed that the work surveyed in his encyclopedia "clearly shows that different people in different countries independently came to the same conclusion" regarding the feasibility of interplanetary travel.

While encyclopedic surveys were documenting the theoretical landscape, parallel experimental work was emerging in Europe. In 1928, J. Navascués of León, Spain described a field coupled dynamo-electric machine concept "producing translatory motion of machine by current reaction with earth's field", in which "Propulsion is caused by cutting with a closed conducting turn the earth's magnetic flux". After the 1930s, related field propulsion research concepts reached a lull in public published activity for over a decade through and after World War II, appearing mainly in science fiction rather than in sustained technical development.

The first clear postwar reappearance of these propulsion concepts in open scientific literature was in the 1958 Franklin Institute astronautics lecture series. H.W. Ritchey, vice-president of Thiokol and head of its rocket program, highlighted 'Field Propulsion' concepts, describing 'the use of fields' as a way to avoid an exhaust jet. In the same monograph, Israel Levitt, director of the Institute's Fels Planetarium, described solar propulsion methods including Krafft Arnold Ehricke's solar thermal concepts, Richard Garwin's radiation pressure sail proposals, and photon rocket research by Kurl Stanukovitch of Russia. U.S. Air Force general Donald L. Putt, who led Operation Paperclip after World War II, predicted that upcoming spacecraft would deploy "photo or ion field-type propulsion".

=== 1960s-1970s ===
As spaceflight programs expanded throughout the 1960s, contractor studies for the U.S. Air Force and NASA increasingly organized advanced propulsion concepts under three main headings, Thermal, Field, and Photon, so that unconventional ideas could be compared within a common analytical framework. A 1972 report from the Air Force Rocket Propulsion Laboratory, followed by Jet Propulsion Laboratory studies in 1975 and 1982, carried this framework forward in published roadmaps. These studies emphasized "infinite specific impulse" systems that would obtain energy or working fluid from the ambient environment, and suggested that advances in lasers and superconductors could revive earlier discarded concepts such as laser propulsion or ramjets. Later reviews characterized propulsion research in this period as driven by unrestricted creativity and "free-thinking".

Terrestrial field propulsion concepts also attracted attention during this period. United Press International reported in 1964 on a proposal from the Westinghouse Air Brake Company to link Youngstown, Ohio with Pittsburgh via a "super conductor magnetic field propulsion" transit system. The Chicago Tribune later reported on early NASA advocacy of what was then called "field resonance propulsion," noting that related magnetohydrodynamics research had begun in 1971 as an extension of training astronauts on solar physics.

=== 1980s ===
In the 1980s, earlier classification frameworks began giving way to attempts to identify and organize specific physical coupling mechanisms capable of producing measurable thrust. In 1980, NASA scientist Al Holt noted that proposed models for field propulsion interactions in this era ranged from Albert Einstein's united field theory efforts to work by "serious 'amateurs'," reflecting how wide the speculative literature around such ideas had become by that period. That year, Holt was quoted by the Chicago Tribune in his advocacy of field propulsion: "One of the most important things to me is to help break down the inhibiting mental attitude that space-time field interactions will remain in the realm of science fiction for hundreds of years." Holt argued that progress toward field-dependent propulsion would require a dedicated "field physics laboratory" to quantify relationships among gravitation, electromagnetism, and spacetime structure, framing the potential payoff as performance beyond then-leading aircraft and spacecraft such as the Space Shuttle, SR-71A, and F-16.

The Huntsville Times reported on a program by TRW Inc.'s Defense and Space Systems Group researching magnetic field based field propulsion, called "force field propulsion", for vehicle launch applications. Robert L. Forward in 1984 extended beamed-sail studies to the interstellar scale, suggesting that phased solar-system lasers could impart sustained acceleration to ultralight sails across astronomical distances, and potential interstellar exploration within a human lifetime. By the late 1980s, magnetic sails emerged as a proposed propellantless concept that would use a superconducting loop to deflect the solar wind or interstellar plasma, and thereby generate thrust or drag without expelling onboard reaction mass.

=== 1990s ===
Electrodynamic work matured across the decade. The Plasma Motor Generator flight in 1993 was later described by NASA as the most sophisticated and most successful electrodynamic-tether mission yet flown. STS-75 in 1996 deployed the TSS-1R Tethered Satellite System payload aboard Columbia, validating high-voltage electrodynamic behavior in orbit and proving the functionality of the space tether field propulsion concept; NASA described it as the first tethered-satellite mission and the longest structure yet flown in space. Beamed-energy propulsion concepts also reached flight-test maturity during this period. In 1997, the laser-propelled Lightcraft was successfully flown in a series of experiments at the High Energy Laser Systems Test Facility at White Sands Missile Range under a joint USAF/NASA flight demonstration program.

NASA's Breakthrough Propulsion Physics Project (BPP) in 1998 reframed field propulsion from a catalog of ideas into a research program defined by falsifiable physical requirements, establishing conservation-law consistency, measurable coupling mechanisms, and experimental reproducibility as the central benchmarks for evaluating advanced propulsion concepts. The program organized research around three goals: propulsion with no propellant mass, maximum physically possible transit speeds, and breakthrough energy sources. BPP raised the question of whether propellantless effects could exist without violating conservation of momentum and energy, and the more speculative end of the spectrum, including concepts that couple to the environment without carrying reaction mass, remained in the research phase.

=== 21st century ===
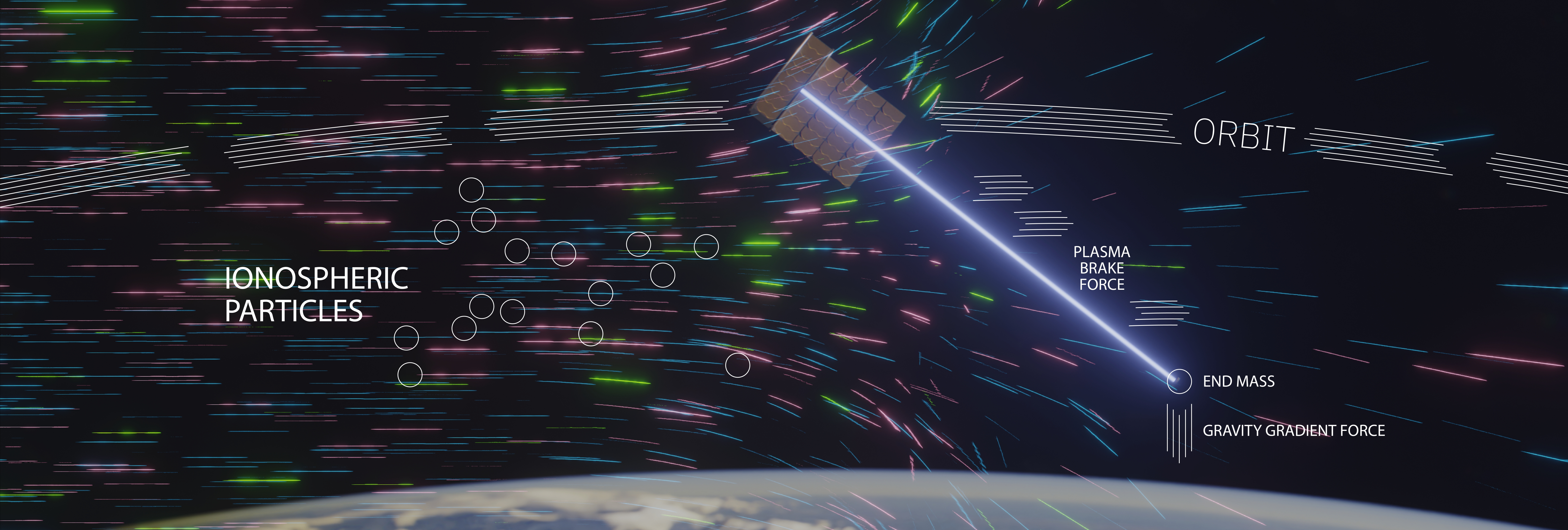
The plasma brake consists of a thin wire, that, when charged, creates electrostatic drag in the ionosphere and can deorbit satellites.

The British National Space Centre and Society of British Aerospace Companies began organizing an annual field propulsion research conference in 2001, inaugurated in Brighton at the Institute of Development Studies, with initial delegates including Harry Kroto. British Aerospace was confirmed in 2001 to have initiated a research program called "Project Greenglow" to research "the possibility of the control of gravitational fields." As demonstrated systems accumulated flight heritage, research programs continued exploring more speculative coupling mechanisms.

Subsequent work largely extended this research, examining whether identifiable environmental interactions could meet the same conservation law and measurement criteria. Later NASA Institute for Advanced Concepts (NIAC) studies continued in the same mold, examining whether Alfvén wave plasma interactions might provide quasi-propellantless thrust. By 2009, a recognized category of 'breakthrough propulsion concepts' had emerged in the interstellar transport literature, encompassing warp drive, traversable wormholes, and vacuum-energy ideas, though the same literature noted strong skepticism about claims that appeared to conflict with conventional demonstrated physics. Related electrostatic sail concepts also moved into in-space technology-demonstration phases in the 2020s, with AuroraSat-1 launching in 2022 as a plasma-brake technology demonstrator and Foresail-1p launching in 2025 with a plasma brake experiment intended to enable the first-ever space measurements of Coulomb drag for orbital change.

=== Arts and culture ===
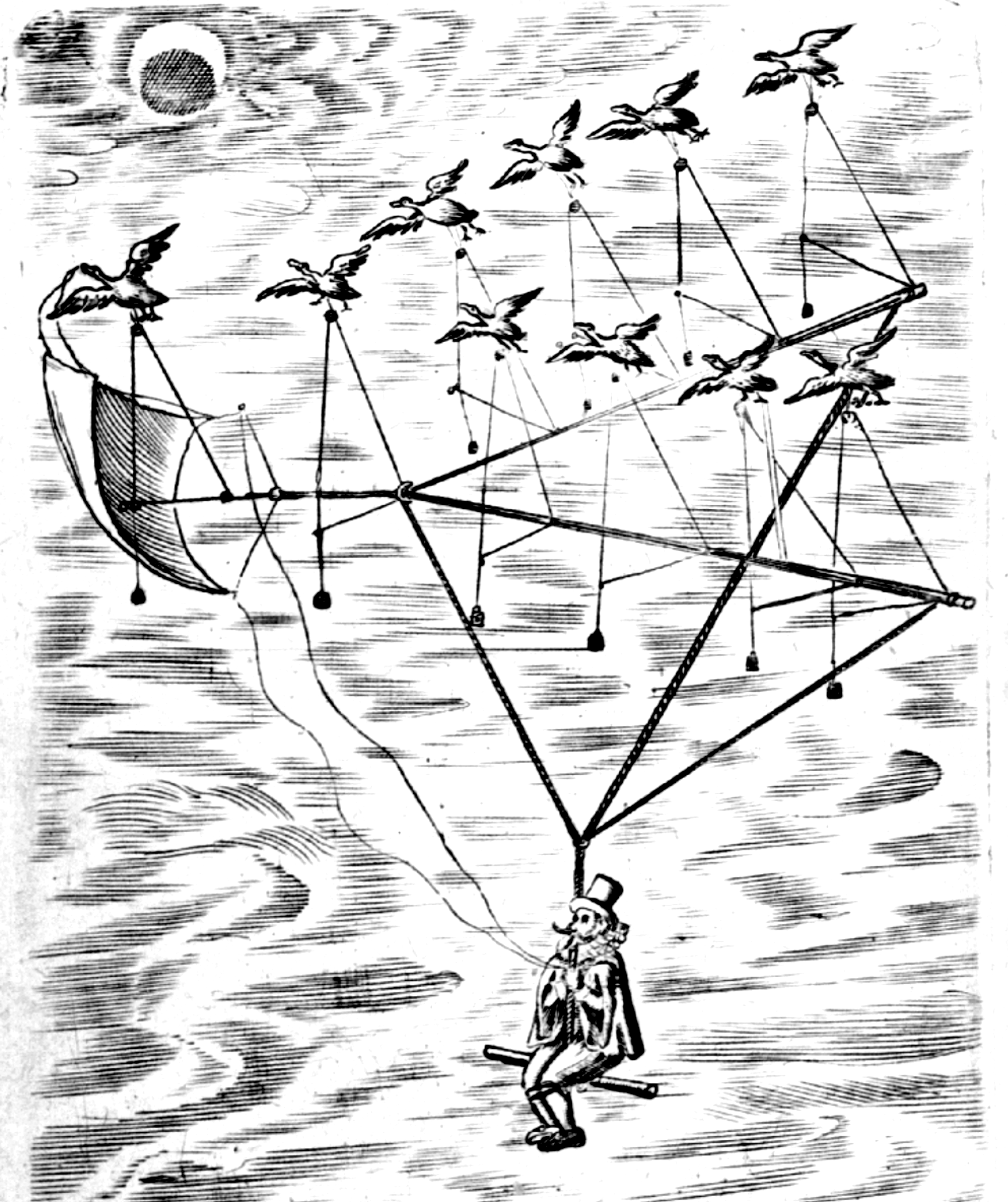
The frontispiece of the second edition of Francis Godwin's Man in the Moone, 1659.

A representation of a Star Trek "warp bubble".

Field propulsion concepts have appeared across literature, film, and television, in many cases predating or paralleling the technical development of the technologies and theories described in this article. Several fictional propulsion systems bear recognizable resemblances to environment-coupled, electromagnetic, or spacetime-interaction concepts later studied in aerospace research.

Fictional antigravity and photon-propulsion ideas emerged well before the underlying physics was formalized. The Encyclopedia of Science Fiction traces fictional gravity counteraction from Francis Godwin's The Man in the Moone (1638), through George Tucker's A Voyage to the Moon (1827) and its antigravity metal "lunarium," to Percy Greg's coinage of "apergy" as an antigravity spacecraft propulsion force in Across the Zodiac (1880). The earliest of these treated the concept in quasi-scientific rather than purely magical terms.

As technical rocketry advanced in the early 20th century, pulp fiction kept pace with its own propulsion inventions. H. G. Wells's The First Men in the Moon (1901) popularized gravity shielding through "cavorite," a material used to construct a sphere capable of leaving Earth without expelling propellant. Similar ideas proliferated across the pulp era: Edgar Rice Burroughs's Barsoom series, beginning with A Princess of Mars (serialized 1912), described Martian airships propelled by a stored "eighth ray" used for lift and maneuvering rather than aerodynamic wings or rocket thrust, while Armageddon 2419 A.D. by Philip Francis Nowlan (1928) described "repellor anti-gravity rays" used as "legs" for airships, alongside "inertron," a substance that reacts to gravity opposite to normal matter. The Buck Rogers comic strip, launched in 1929, carried Nowlan's repulsor-beam and inertron concepts into the visual medium. The Encyclopedia of Science Fiction credited E. E. Smith's Spacehounds of IPC (1931) as containing the first use of the term "force field" in science fiction.

By mid-century, science fiction was moving beyond individual gadgets toward propulsion concepts with explicit theoretical rationales. The Encyclopedia of Science Fiction attributes early use of "space warp" and "hyperspace" terminology in the context of interstellar travel to John W. Campbell's Islands of Space (serialized 1931 in Amazing Stories Quarterly; published as a novel in 1957). James Blish's Cities in Flight series, beginning with "Bindlestiff" (December 1950, Astounding Science Fiction), introduced the "spindizzy," formally the Dillon-Wagoner Graviton Polarity Generator. The Encyclopedia of Science Fiction described the spindizzy as, in its day, "one of the best-loved items of sf Terminology," and noted that Blish gave the device a rationale rooted in theoretical physics, in which gravity fields are generated or cancelled by rotation owing to a fictional "Blackett-Dirac effect." The National Air and Space Museum identified Forbidden Planet (1956) as the first film to depict a faster-than-light starship built by humans; Time (magazine) described the starship's propulsion as a "quanto-gravitetic hyperdrive," and the published screenplay text includes the same phrasing in its opening narration.

Fiction magazines of this era also served as platforms for promoting claimed real-world propulsion devices. The Dean drive, a claimed reactionless device built by Norman L. Dean, received extensive promotion from John W. Campbell in Astounding Science Fiction beginning in 1960. Campbell published photographs of the device operating on a bathroom scale, and the June 1960 cover of Astounding featured a painting of a United States submarine near Mars supposedly propelled by a Dean drive. In 1984, physicist Amit Goswami wrote that the Dean drive had become so embedded in genre consciousness that "it is now customary in SF circles to refer to a reactionless drive as a Dean drive." Cordwainer Smith's "The Lady Who Sailed The Soul" (Galaxy Science Fiction, April 1960) is among the earliest clearly sourced fictional treatments of photon-pressure sailing as a spacecraft propulsion method. The Visual Encyclopedia of Science Fiction catalogued antigravity, the Dean drive, inertialess drive, sails, and spindizzy as distinct propulsion categories for space travel in the genre.

The influence between fiction and field propulsion research became most visible through television. Star Trek: The Original Series (premiered September 8, 1966) made "warp drive" and "tractor beam" household terms. Star Trek would later introduce a biologically mediated propulsion system with Star Trek: Discovery's spore drive, which uses a subspace fungal network for instantaneous travel. Physicist Miguel Alcubierre stated that his 1994 theoretical warp metric, a solution formulated within general relativity describing the expansion of spacetime behind and contraction in front of a theoretical spacecraft, was directly inspired by the terminology used in Star Trek; The Planetary Society described him as having developed the model "inspired by Star Trek." Alcubierre's warp metric remains one of the clearest documented cases in which a science fiction concept directly catalyzed formal physics research into field propulsion.

== Definitions ==
The term field propulsion means spacecraft propulsion using electromagnetic fields, either fields generated on the spacecraft to propel ionized fluid or fields in the environment of the spacecraft, manipulated to create propulsion. Examples of the first category include plasma thrusters and ion engines; examples of environmental field propulsion include Alfven wave propulsion, electrostatic lift The term was used as one set of ideas, along with thermal propulsion (for example nuclear propulsion) and photon propulsion (for example solar sails) in the development of a program to create new kinds of propulsion systems.

In general propulsion systems can be classified as based on collisions or interactions with fields. Field propulsion requires controllable asymmetric fields that travel with the spacecraft. Since propulsion conserves momentum, any field propulsion system that does not eject mass from a spacecraft requires the field to supply the reaction mass to create acceleration. This reaction mass must be available throughout the region the spacecraft operates and there must be a controllable, sustainable coupling mechanism able to induce sufficient asymmetric reaction force.

== Related concepts ==
In broader historical literature, field propulsion was not always used as a strict synonym for modern propellantless propulsion; depending on the framework, it could also encompass related beamed-energy concepts and terrestrial field-matter coupling systems treated within the same analytical family. By contrast, propellantless propulsion in the narrower modern sense produces thrust through interaction with the surrounding environment rather than by expelling reaction mass. The boundaries of the term have therefore varied across successive classification frameworks, program definitions, and research criteria over more than a century of use. This article discusses the subject across that full historical range as documented in the source literature.

Magnetic sail concepts, proposed by Dana Andrews and Robert Zubrin, exemplify this approach. In the broader historical literature, related terrestrial electromagnetic field-matter systems such as electrohydrodynamics (EHD) and magnetohydrodynamics (MHD) were also sometimes discussed within the same field-propulsion family, alongside more speculative proposals involving general relativity, quantum field theory.

Conservation of momentum is a fundamental requirement of propulsion systems because momentum is always conserved. This conservation law is implicit in the published work of Isaac Newton and Galileo Galilei, but arises on a fundamental level from the spatial translation symmetry of the laws of physics, as given by Noether's theorem.

Any propulsion method that claims to generate net thrust in a closed system without external interaction violates the conservation of momentum, which follows from the spatial translation symmetry of physical law (Noether's theorem). Some speculative field propulsion concepts may require extensions to established physical theories, including beyond the Standard Model of particle physics and cosmology. Millis notes that proposed "space drive" schemes where forces act only internally produce no net motion, and relates this "net external force requirement" to the conservation of momentum.

=== Beamed-energy propulsion ===
In the broader historical literature used here, beam-powered propulsion was often discussed alongside field propulsion because it shifted energy supply offboard and, in some concepts, also drew working fluid or momentum exchange from the surroundings, even though many such systems do not fit the narrower modern propellantless-only sense. Beam-powered propulsion sends power from a remote source directly to a spacecraft propulsion system using directed-energy technologies such as lasers, microwaves, or relativistic charged-particle beams. A NASA contractor report surveyed such concepts, seeking large gains in payload, range, and terminal velocity beyond chemical rocket performance. The report identified enabling technologies (e.g., higher-current superconductors, potential room-temperature superconductors, metallic hydrogen) as then-potential paths to field propulsion prospects.

A study from the Air Force Research Laboratory concluded that researchers should prioritize concepts that draw both working fluid and energy from surroundings, because of their implications for outstanding performance. Proposals also include advanced electrostatic and MHD-based concepts that could leverage charged particle interactions with atmospheric fields or ionospheric plasmas and geomagnetic fields to produce directed motion. Some approaches use atmospheric or environmental material as working fluid or interaction medium, drawing reaction mass or momentum exchange from the ambient environment rather than from onboard propellant. The study suggested improvements in technologies like high-power lasers or new energy transfer methods could revitalize previously discarded propulsion ideas, including laser propulsion and infinite-Isp ramjets.

=== Theoretical proposals ===
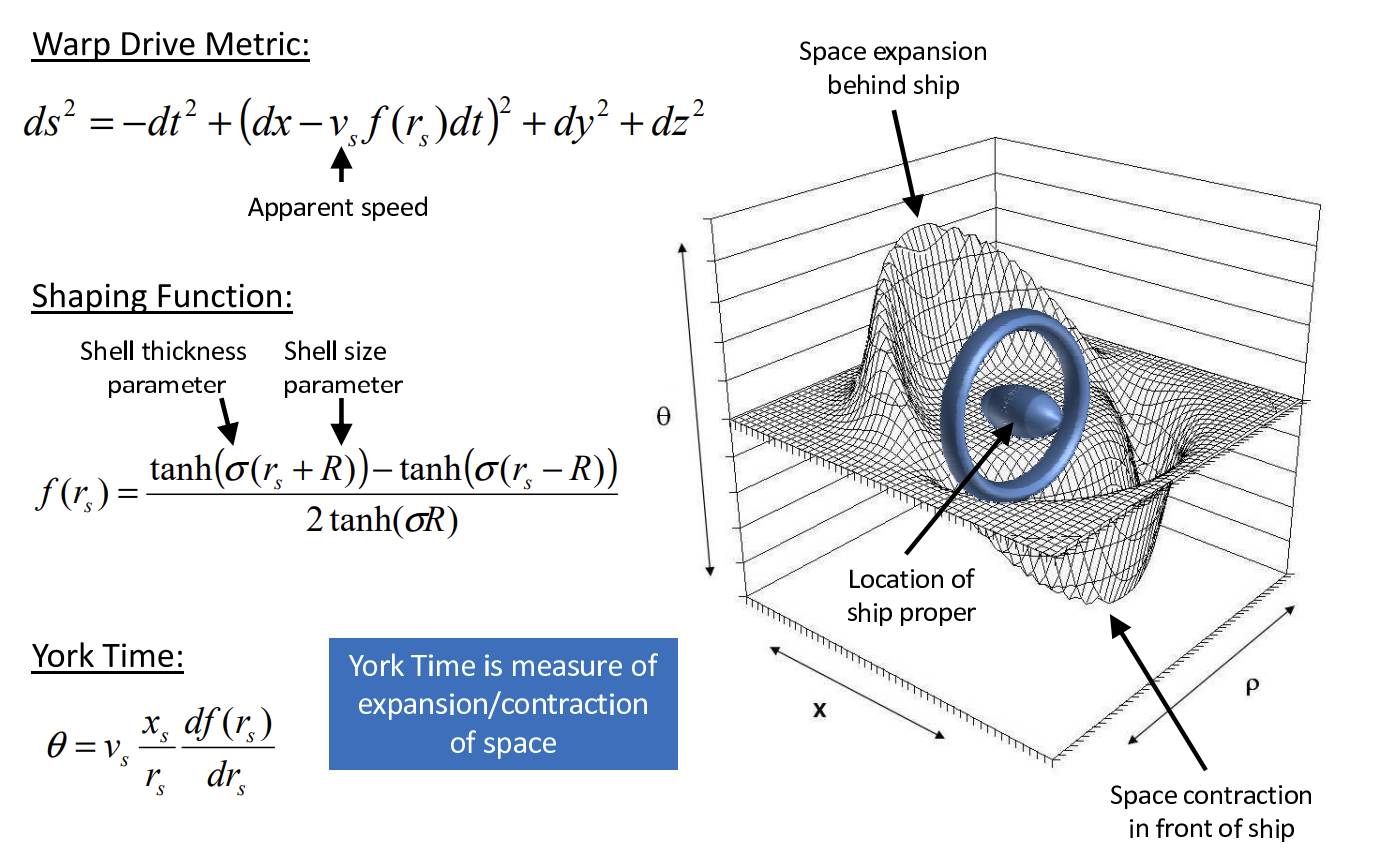
Alcubierre metric, related to Alcubierre drives, by Harold G. White, NASA Johnson Space Center. It depicts a 'warp bubble' in which spacetime expands behind and contracts in front of an example spacecraft as a theoretical propulsion concept.

NASA's Breakthrough Propulsion Physics (BPP) memo framed research questions at the limits of physics, no-propellant propulsion, ultimate transit speeds, and breakthrough energy production, explicitly to sort physically testable ideas from non-viable claims. Field propulsion alone was described as insufficient for practical interstellar exploration because no propulsion theory currently exceeds the speed of light, requiring a navigation theory as a secondary solution alongside propulsion theory. Practical interstellar exploration was framed as a combined problem of propulsion theory and navigation theory, rather than as a propulsion-only problem. A 2009 propulsion survey framed one motivation for field propulsion research in operational terms, arguing that if field interactions could reduce effective gravitational and inertial resistance, rocket thrust and propellant requirements for Earth-to-orbit flight would be substantially reduced.

Minami's navigation theory framing was situated within similar extra-dimensional theory discussions, including Kaluza-Klein theory, supergravity theory, superstring theory, M theory, and D-brane-related superstring theory, as part of the paper's conceptual background for interstellar navigation.

Vacuum-fluctuation phenomena such as the Casimir effect have been measured in many precision experiments and are reviewed extensively in the mainstream literature. However, attempts to obtain net thrust or a gravity coupling from static electromagnetic configurations (often framed as "electrogravitic" effects) have not produced reproducible anomalous forces in controlled tests.. Similarly the Biefeld–Brown effect has not lead to effective propulsion.

== Types ==
A wide range of propulsion methods have been proposed or demonstrated that fit within broad definitions of field propulsion. This taxonomy reflects how late twentieth-century contractor reports and program reviews organized the subject, and how later surveys distinguish environment-coupled momentum exchange from more speculative proposals. One group comprises environment-coupled systems that utilize their surroundings to produce thrust, including magnetic sails, and, with certain restrictions, electrodynamic tethers, which use the solar wind or ambient magnetic fields to generate thrust. In one example design, a magnetic sail uses a loop of superconducting cable to create a magnetic field that deflects solar wind plasma and imparts momentum to the attached spacecraft.

A more speculative class invokes direct interactions with a structured vacuum or with spacetime geometry, proposing thrust without expelling mass, an idea discussed in general relativity and quantum field theory literature but not empirically validated. The sections below follow the broader historical literature usage outlined above, treating propellantless environment-coupled systems as the core cases while also retaining related beamed-energy concepts, terrestrial field interactions, and more speculative proposals where the source literature grouped them under the same field-propulsion umbrella.

=== Demonstrated ===
Various field propulsion approaches and systems have achieved experimental validation, flight heritage, or sustained engineering development.

==== Environment-coupled momentum exchange ====
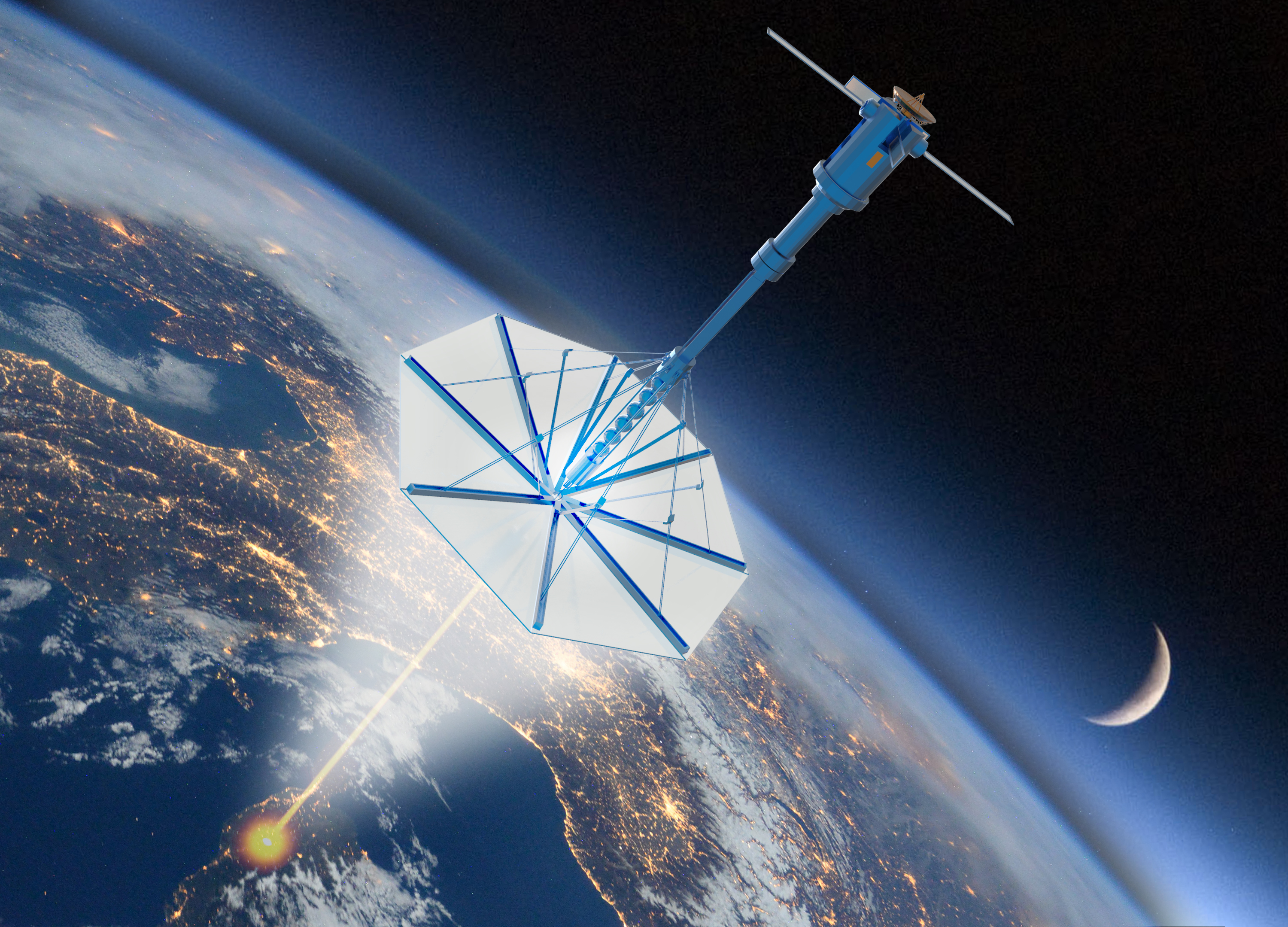
Rendering of an interstellar light sail craft.

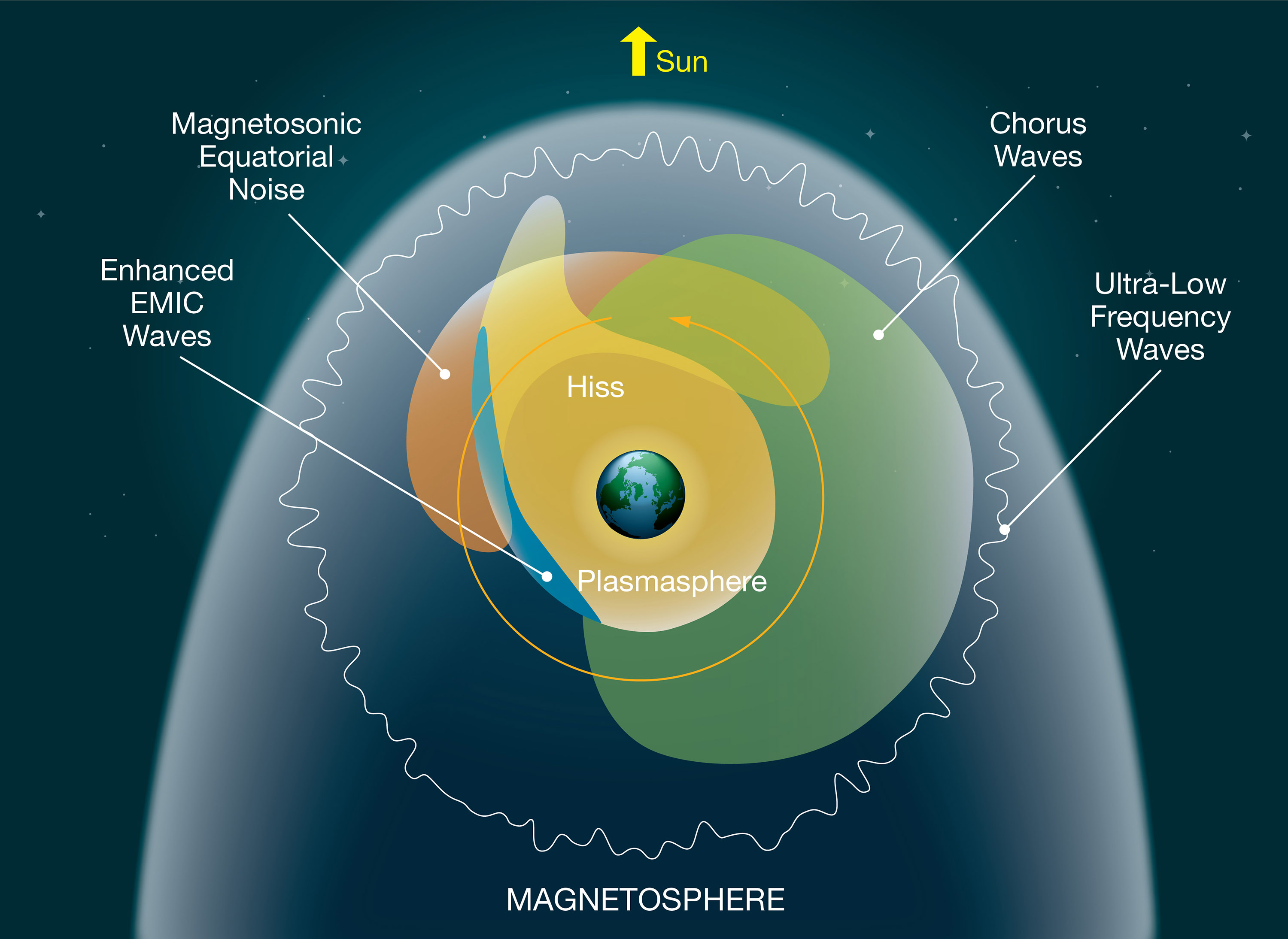
NASA Goddard schematic of Earth's magnetosphere with regions of natural plasma waves (including chorus, magnetosonic, ultra-low frequency waves, and plasmaspheric hiss). Plasma-wave propulsion concepts propose to couple with such wave-particle interactions.

Sailcraft engineering couples ultra-light structures to stringent pointing and thermal constraints. Once deployed, thrust is almost normal to the sail, so small attitude changes steer the thrust vector. Performance evolves with materials science and control: lower areal density (mass per unit sail area) directly increases acceleration, and by tilting the sail the small continuous thrust can be steered for precise trajectory shaping. Square and heliogyro designs use thin film sails on deployable booms; reliable deployment of large, low-mass structures and thin films is a key challenge. Typical sail films have reflective front coats and high-emissivity back coats; wrinkling and billowing reduce efficiency. Forward (Journal of Spacecraft and Rockets, 1984) outlined a proposed method of how solar-system-based laser systems and a roughly 1,000 km light-focusing Fresnel lens system could propel thin-film sails to ~0.11% of the speed of light, enabling an unmanned flyby of Alpha Centauri in approximately 40 years. In Forward's proposal, a two-stage sail system in which a massive ring sail reflects laser light back onto a detached payload sail, enabling the unmanned spacecraft to rendezvous and brake within the Alpha Centauri system.

Analyses of magnetic sail concepts indicate thrust arises from deflecting the solar wind around a spacecraft-supported magnetic field, with performance set by the distance at which solar-wind pressure balances the sail's magnetic pressure; larger effective magnetic cross-sections increase momentum transfer but require large-radius, high-current superconducting coils. Mission studies of magnetic sails show that they can perform heliocentric transfers between circular orbits by using the solar wind for outbound acceleration and inbound braking. Magsails have also been proposed for interstellar missions, where interaction with the interstellar medium provides propellantless terminal deceleration into a destination solar system. Key engineering challenges include the mass and size of the superconducting loop and the constraints imposed by achievable superconducting currents and magnetic fields. The design tradeoffs emphasize achieving a large effective magnetic cross-section for the superconducting loop while keeping its mass low. Magnetospheric plasma propulsion (M2P2) is a NIAC proposal by Robert Winglee, in which plasma injection inflates a magnetic bubble that couples with the solar wind. It is considered a variant of magnetic sails.

The most studied examples are electrodynamic tethers (EDT), which generate Lorentz-force-based drag or thrust by coupling a long current-carrying conductor to a planetary magnetic field, thereby exchanging momentum with a planetary magnetosphere or ionosphere to enable propellantless drag or thrust in suitable environments (e.g., low Earth orbit), and fall under broad definitions of field propulsion due to their use of external fields for momentum exchange. In operation, a conductive tether moving through a planetary magnetic field experiences a motional electromotive force, a voltage induced by its motion through the field; closing the circuit through the ambient ionosphere allows current to flow, and the resulting Lorentz force can provide either drag (for deorbit) or, with external power injection, thrust along specific orbital geometries. As open systems, they conserve momentum by reaction with the ambient plasma and magnetic field. Electrodynamic tethers have been deployed in several space tether missions, including the TSS-1, TSS-1R, and Plasma Motor Generator (PMG) experiments. Electrodynamic tethers can also generate electrical power at the expense of orbital energy.

Related electrostatic sail concepts also entered in-space technology-demonstration phases in the 2020s. NASA's small-spacecraft propulsion survey described the electric sail and the closely related plasma brake as relatively immature environment-coupled propulsion technologies, and noted that AuroraSat-1, launched on May 5, 2022, served as a technology demonstration mission for a Plasma Brake module. In 2025, Aalto University in Finland reported the launch of Foresail-1p carrying a Plasma Brake experiment intended to enable the first-ever space measurements of Coulomb drag, in which a charged tether interacts with surrounding plasma to change a satellite's orbit.

=== Development and testing ===
These are concepts under active engineering development or testing that adapt field-based acceleration or coupling principles for new operational regimes. As in the historical survey literature discussed above, this section includes some systems that fall outside the narrower propellantless-only sense of field propulsion, especially externally powered concepts and terrestrial field-matter coupling applications.

==== Beamed-energy and externally powered thrust ====
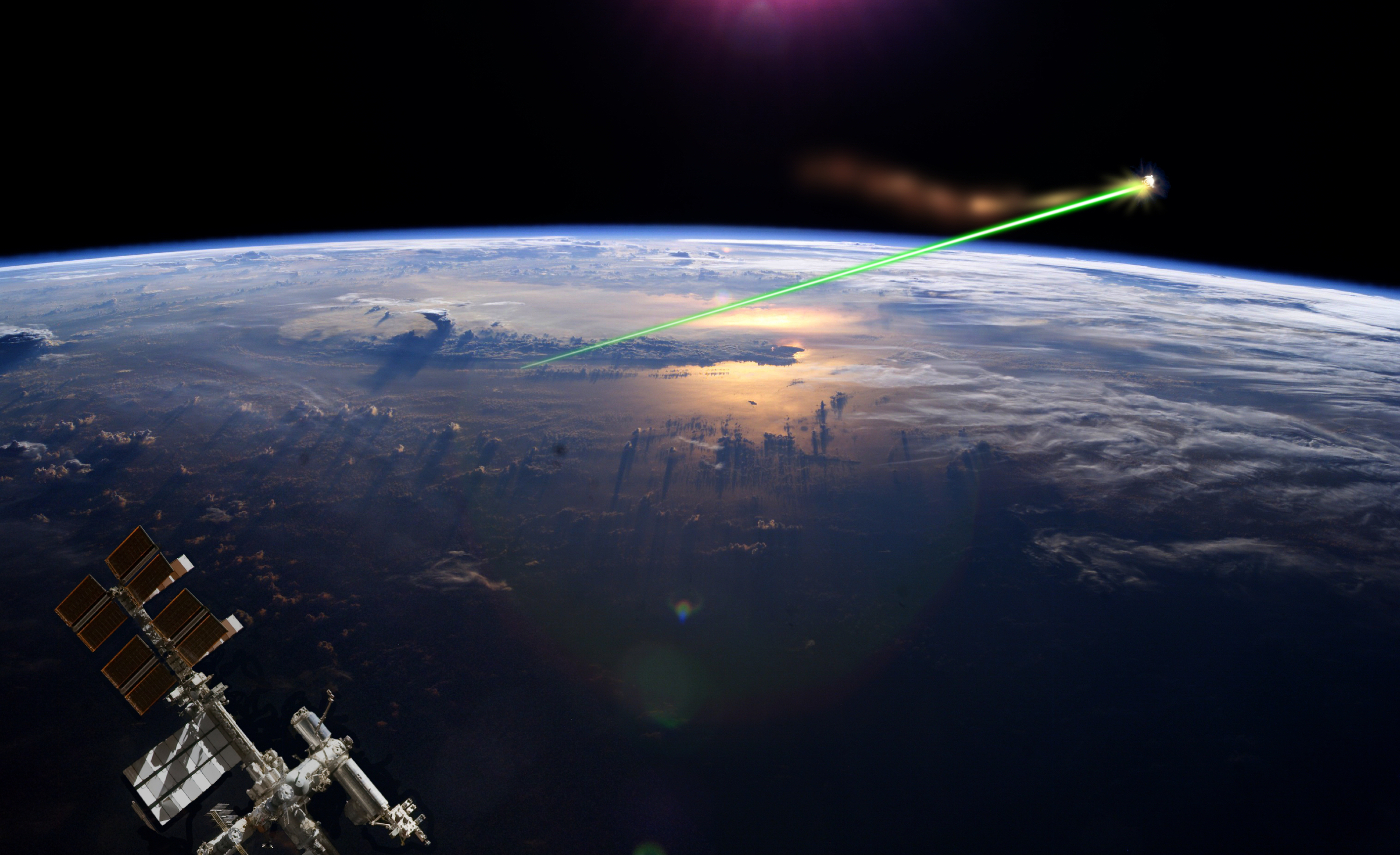
A rendering of a laser broom concept. Beamed-energy systems proposed for debris removal share technology heritage with laser propulsion concepts.

Microwave electrothermal thrusters use microwave energy, potentially externally supplied, to heat a fluid propellant. When powered externally, it falls under beamed-energy propulsion with mass acceleration via directed fields. Laser ablation propulsion uses pulsed laser energy to ablate onboard material into a plasma jet; although it expels mass, the energy source is external, placing it within beamed-energy propulsion approaches. Photonic laser thrusters are a photon-pressure system that relies on externally beamed lasers instead of sunlight.

Leik Myrabo's beamed-energy Lightcraft program, spanning several decades, employed a projected-power, combined-cycle MHD system designed to reconfigure across multiple flight regimes. Czysz and Bruno also highlighted the concept's very low onboard propellant requirement, writing that it had "the least onboard propellants of any system". Myrabo's architecture was described as scalable by siting the projector on Earth, in orbit, or on the Moon, explicitly noting propulsion implications for geosynchronous orbit, the Moon, and nearby planetary/moon systems. Research has been limited to laboratory testing and subscale atmospheric Lightcraft demonstrations, with orbital proposals remaining unflown.

==== Field-interaction in atmosphere or dense media ====
Broad historical treatments of field propulsion placed terrestrial field-matter coupling systems alongside space-oriented concepts, even though these operate in dense media rather than as propellantless spacecraft. Although not presently in wide use for space, there exist proven terrestrial examples of field propulsion in which electromagnetic fields act upon a conducting medium such as seawater or plasma for propulsion, known collectively as magnetohydrodynamics (MHD). MHD is similar in operation to electric motors, however, rather than using moving parts or metal conductors, fluid or plasma conductors are employed. The EMS-1 is an example of such electromagnetic field-propulsion systems, first described in 1994.

Electrohydrodynamics (EHD) is another method where electrically charged fluids are accelerated for propulsion and flow control; laboratory and flight demonstrations include ion devices driven by corona discharge, in which a strong electric field ionizes surrounding air to create a thrust-producing flow of charged particles. Magnetohydrodynamic interaction concepts extending magnetohydrodynamics (MHD) to space plasma propose generating thrust by exchanging momentum with ambient charged particles via Lorentz-force coupling. If the interacting plasma is external (e.g., ionospheric or solar wind), the system qualifies as field propulsion.

=== Proposed and theorized ===
Representation of Earth curving surrounding spacetime in general relativity, illustrating how gravitational fields are treated as distortions of the underlying spacetime structure. Some proposed field propulsion concepts aim to couple with such structural changes.

A 1979 NASA technical memorandum outlined a speculative field resonance propulsion concept that hypothesized thrust from a resonance between coherent pulsed electromagnetic field waveforms and gravitational waveforms associated with spacetime metrics, framed as potentially enabling galactic travel without prohibitive travel times. It was proposed that applying this to an electrically insulating material could, via Lorentz forces on charges bound within the material, affect its inertia and thereby create acceleration without internal mechanical stress. Potential concepts studied by NASA and other parties have included vacuum polarization, engineered spacetime curvature, and zero-point-field interactions; none have been experimentally validated, and all face unresolved consistency issues with momentum conservation. These concepts are discussed in aerospace literature primarily as theoretical or exploratory frameworks rather than operational propulsion technologies.

== Ongoing missions and research ==
Concepts once unproven now fly in space, and research continues on the remaining unproven options. (Note: This distinction separates systems with in-space demonstration or flight heritage from propulsion concepts that remain exploratory. ACS3 and Foresail-1p support the continuing demonstration side, while NIAC plasma-wave studies and NASA's Breakthrough Propulsion Physics work support the continuing research and evaluation of unproven concepts.)

== Demonstrated and proposed systems ==
The following table summarizes first demonstrated usage, operational domain, and development status for field propulsion subtypes discussed in this article, ranging from systems with flight heritage to theoretical proposals.

First demonstrated usage by field propulsion subtype
| Propulsion subtype | Domain | First demonstrated usage | Date | Vehicle / mission | Status | Remarks |
|---|---|---|---|---|---|---|
| Electrodynamic tether | Space | TSS-1 deployment from Space Shuttle | 1992 | TSS-1 (NASA) | Demonstrated | Environment-coupled; exchanges momentum with planetary magnetosphere. TSS-1R (1996, STS-75) and PMG also demonstrated. |
| Lightcraft (beamed-energy) | Atmospheric | Subscale atmospheric flight demonstrations | 1997 | Lightcraft (Leik Myrabo) | Demonstrated (subscale atmospheric) | First flight in 1997. Beamed-energy combined-cycle MHD; orbital proposals remain unflown. |
| Electrohydrodynamic (EHD) aircraft | Atmospheric | Solid-state propulsion aircraft flight | 2018 | MIT EHD aircraft (Xu et al.) | Demonstrated | Atmospheric; corona-discharge-driven ionic wind propulsion with no moving parts. |
| Laser lightsail (interstellar) | Space | – | – | – | Proposed | Laser-pushed thin-film sail to ~0.11c proposed by Forward (1984). |
| Magnetospheric plasma propulsion (M2P2) | Space | – | – | – | Proposed | Plasma-inflated magnetic bubble couples with solar wind; NIAC proposal by Winglee; variant of magnetic sails. |
| Magnetic sail | Space | – | – | – | Proposed | Environment-coupled; superconducting loop deflects solar wind. Proposed by Andrews and Zubrin. |
| Vacuum / spacetime coupling | Space | – | – | – | Theoretical | No experimental validation; unresolved consistency issues with momentum conservation. |

== See also ==
- Bussard ramjet – Proposed spacecraft propulsion method
- Emerging technologies – Technology still to be fully developed
- History of aviation
- History of rockets
- History of spaceflight
- New Millennium Program – NASA projects to test new space technologies
- Non-rocket spacelaunch – Concepts for launch into space
- Spacecraft electric propulsion – Type of spacecraft propulsion using electrical energy to accelerate propellant
- Timeline of aviation
- Timeline of rocket and missile technology
- Timeline of spaceflight
