= Martin Wood (engineer) =

British engineer (1927–2021)

Sir Martin Wood CBE FRS HonFREng
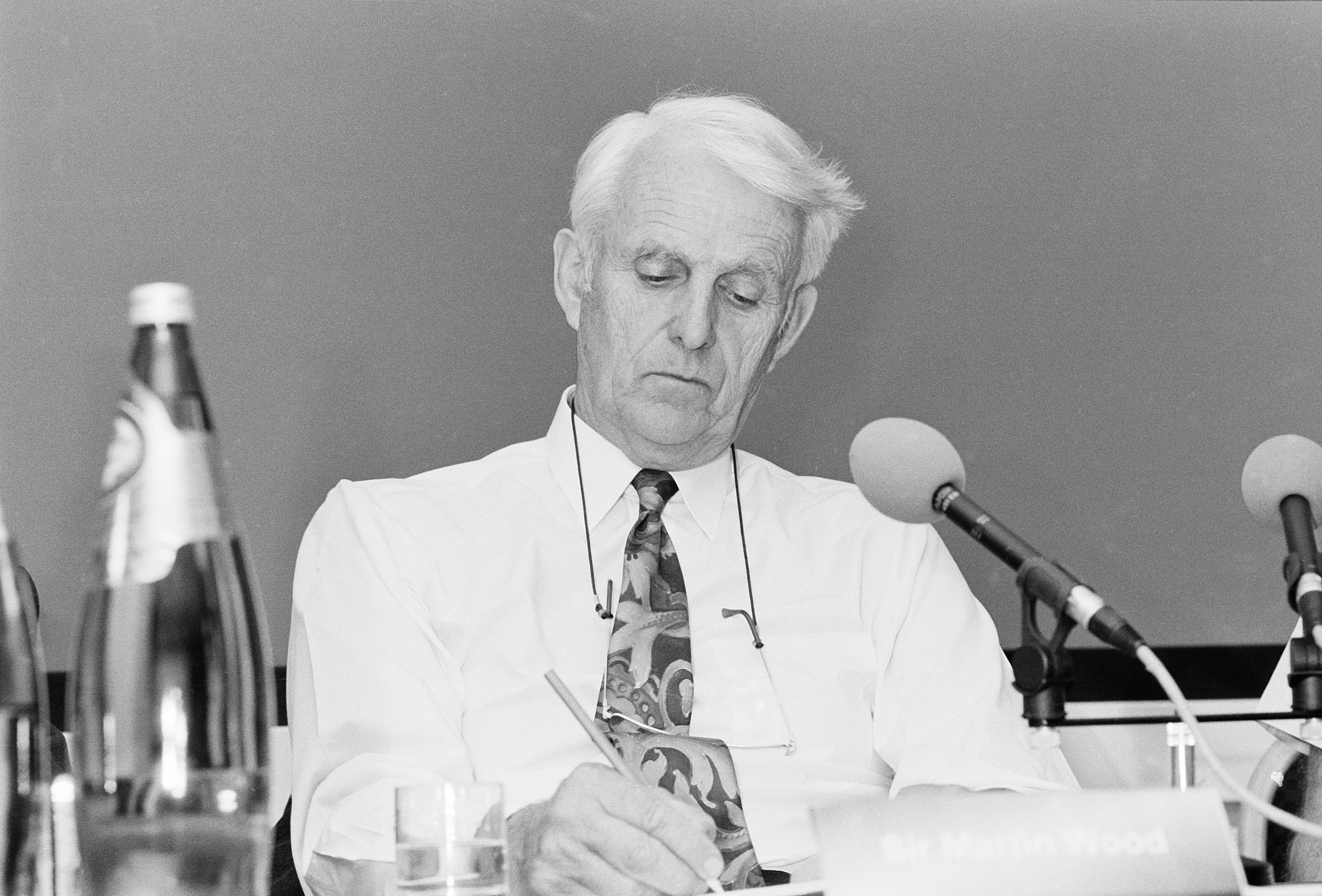
- Born: 19 April 1927
- Died: 23 November 2021 (aged 94)
- Engineering career
- Institutions: Oxford Instruments
- Projects: superconducting magnets

Sir Martin Francis Wood (19 April 1927 – 23 November 2021) was a British engineer and entrepreneur. He co-founded Oxford Instruments, one of the first spin-out companies from the University of Oxford and still one of the most successful. He created this business out of his research into magnets, and went on to build the first commercial MRI scanner, an invention that has saved millions of lives throughout the world.

== Life ==
Martin Wood was educated at Gresham's School, Holt and Trinity College, Cambridge, where he read engineering, and Imperial College, London. In 1945 he joined the Coal Board as a Bevin Boy for his National Service, working underground at the coal face first in South Wales and later in the Midlands. From 1955 to 1969, he was a Senior Research Officer at the Clarendon Laboratory at the University of Oxford. He used the knowledge he acquired on high field magnets to form Oxford Instruments in 1959, at his home in Northmoor Road, North Oxford. Two years later new superconductors were developed in the US, and he soon acquired some material and made the first superconducting magnet outside the US in 1962. Oxford Instruments has since developed these magnets for research and NMR analysis and eventually developed the whole-body superconducting magnets which made possible the development of magnetic resonance imaging.

In 1955, he married Audrey Buxton, with whom he had two step-children, Robin and Sarah, and two children, Jonny and Patsy.

Sir Martin and Lady Wood made philanthropic achievements, including donating £2m for the building of the Sir Martin Wood Lecture Theatre at the Clarendon Laboratory. He also founded the Earth Trust to promote nature conservation at Little Wittenham and the Wittenham Clumps, The Oxford Trust for the promotion of scientific education and science-based enterprise, and the Sylva Foundation to support sustainable forest management. In 2005, Oxford Innovation, a company that came out of the Oxford Trust, launched the Martin and Audrey Wood Enterprise Awards for entrepreneurship.

Wood was knighted by Queen Elizabeth II at Buckingham Palace in 1986. He was elected a Fellow of the Royal Society in 1987, was a recipient of the Order of the Rising Sun, and received honorary degrees from eight British universities. He was President of Farm Africa, a development charity co-founded by his late brother Sir Michael Wood.

He died after a short illness on 23 November 2021, at the age of 94. His work pioneering the development of superconducting magnets facilitated Magnetic Resonance Imaging (MRI), leading to millions of lives being saved every year.

== Honours ==
Wood received a number of honours:

- Honorary doctorate from Oxford University
- Royal Society Mullard Award
- Fellow of the Royal Society, 1987
- Commander of the Order of the British Empire
- Order of the Rising Sun
- Knighthood
- Honorary Fellow of the Royal Academy of Engineering in 1994
- President's Medal of the IOP, 2002

Two awards sponsored by Oxford Instruments are directly named in recognition of Wood; the Sir Martin Wood Prize which is presented in Japan and the Sir Martin Wood Science Prize for China.
