= Githinji =

Githinji is a surname. Notable people with the surname include:

- Githinji Gitahi, Kenyan medical doctor
- Nice Githinji (born 1985), Kenyan actress
