= Amref International University =

University in Nairobi, Kenya

Coordinates: 1.31933°S 36.80994°E

- Former names: Amref International Training Centre
- Motto: Inspiring Lasting Change; Latin: Inìcere perpetuam mutationem
- Type: Private
- Established: 2017
- Affiliations: Amref Health Africa
- Chancellor: Festus Mogae
- Vice-Chancellor: Joachim Osur
- Location: Nairobi, Kenya
- Campus: Urban
- Website: amref.ac.ke

Amref International University is located in Nairobi in Kenya.It is run by Amref Health Africa
