= Jaw-Shen Tsai =

American condensed-matter physicist

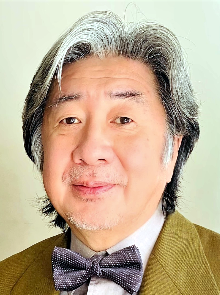
- Born: February 8, 1952 (age 74); Taipei, Taiwan
- Citizenship: United States
- Education: University of California, Berkeley (BA); Stony Brook University (PhD)
- Known for: Pioneering research on superconducting qubits and their quantum control
- Scientific career
- Fields: Low-temperature solid-state physics
- Workplaces: NEC; RIKEN; Tokyo University of Science; National Yang Ming Chiao Tung University

Jaw-Shen Tsai (Chinese: 蔡兆申; born February 8, 1952) is a Taiwan-born American physicist specializing in low-temperature solid-state physics. He is known for pioneering research on superconducting qubits and their quantum control. In 1999, he, Yasunobu Nakamura, and their colleagues achieved the first demonstration of qubit operation in a superconducting circuit.

He has conducted research at NEC and RIKEN, and was appointed a professor at the Tokyo University of Science in 2015 and a chair professor at National Yang Ming Chiao Tung University in 2025.

== Early life and education ==
Tsai was born in Taipei, Taiwan, on February 8, 1952. He earned a Bachelor of Arts degree in physics from the University of California, Berkeley, in 1975 and a PhD in physics from Stony Brook University in 1983.

== Career ==
In 1983, Tsai became a research scientist at NEC's Microelectronics Research Laboratories. He subsequently held positions as a fellow at the company's Fundamental Research Laboratories and Nano Electronics Research Laboratories.

In 2001, he took on a concurrent appointment as team leader of RIKEN's Macroscopic Quantum Coherence Team. His later positions at RIKEN included group director of the Single Quantum Dynamics Research Group and team leader of the Superconducting Quantum Simulation Research Team.

He was appointed a professor at the Tokyo University of Science in 2015 and a chair professor at National Yang Ming Chiao Tung University in 2025.

== Research ==
In 1999, Tsai, Yasunobu Nakamura, and Yu. A. Pashkin observed quantum oscillations in a small superconducting circuit known as a Cooper-pair box, demonstrating electrical control of a qubit in a solid-state electronic device. The results were published in Nature.

In 2003, Tsai and collaborators observed quantum oscillations in two coupled superconducting charge qubits. In a separate study published that year, Tsai and collaborators demonstrated conditional gate operation using two superconducting charge qubits.

His research has also included the generation and detection of single microwave photons using superconducting quantum circuits. The Japan Academy has recognized Nakamura and Tsai's work as a pioneering contribution to the development of superconducting quantum computing.

== Honors and awards ==
- 2000: Fellow, American Physical Society
- 2004: Nishina Memorial Prize
- 2007: Honorary Professor, National Chiao Tung University
- 2008: Simon Memorial Prize (with Yasunobu Nakamura)
- 2010: Fellow, Japan Society of Applied Physics
- 2013: Quantum Innovator Award
- 2014: The 11th Leo Esaki Prize (with Yasunobu Nakamura)
- 2018: Medal with Purple Ribbon
- 2021: Asahi Prize (for fiscal year 2020, with Yasunobu Nakamura)
- 2023: Japan Academy Prize (with Yasunobu Nakamura)
- 2023: Hattori Hoko Award (with Yasunobu Nakamura)
- 2023: C&C Prize (with Yasunobu Nakamura)
- 2024: Asian Scientist 100, Asian Scientist
- 2024: Elected a member of Academia Sinica
