= Michael Wood (surgeon) =

British surgeon (1918–1987)

Sir Michael Wood (28 January 1918 – 16 May 1987), was a British surgeon. He studied medicine, and in 1943 he qualified as a surgeon and soon after was married to Susan Buxton, daughter of African missionaries.

Wood's wife's deep-rooted interest in Africa, after spending her early life in Belgian Congo, led to the move of the family to East Africa. They arrived at the port of Mombasa in 1946. With the help of Gerald Anderson, Wood established himself as a general surgeon in East Africa. Soon he found he was regularly being called to emergencies beyond the confines of the city of Nairobi. Often he had to charter flights to remote locations where no hospitals existed. The number of these emergencies escalated and became a challenge. Mindful of what lay ahead, Wood learnt to fly.

In 1954, Wood went to England on a Marks Plastic Surgery Fellowship with Archibald McIndoe. Together with Thomas D. Rees, an American surgeon (also a beneficiary of the Marks Plastic Surgery Fellowship), they would develop the idea of the African Medical and Research Foundation (AMREF) and its Flying Doctors Service. The needs for fundraising for AMREF were very demanding from the word go, which Wood undertook tirelessly. This involved him taking breaks from his work in Africa to solicit funds in Europe and North America. He personally recruited Leonore Semler of Germany who in turn raised millions of euros on behalf of the organization over 50 years. Wood's fundraising trips brought him into contact with famous people: the Aga Khan IV, Vice-President Richard Nixon, as well as David Rockefeller.

According to Sister Breege Breslin, one of the Medical Missionaries of Mary who worked with Wood on many occasions as his theatre nurse, said that it was his faith and his determination to help ease a situation that made him the ‘Legend’ he became. Sister Breege said during an interview that even after long hours of surgery, with very little daylight left for him to fly back to base, Wood would always take the time to see one last patient.

Wood was the subject of This Is Your Life in 1972 when he was surprised by Eamonn Andrews in the bush country of Southern Kenya.

In 1970, he was awarded the Royal Africa Society Gold Medal for services to Africa and in the 1985 New Years Honours List he was knighted by Queen Elizabeth II. In 1986, he was given the Raoul Wallenberg Award for Humanity.

Wood retired from being Director General of AMREF in 1983 and soon afterward went on to establish Farm Africa (Food and Agricultural Research Mission). In 1987 Wood died of cancer at his home in Nairobi, Kenya.
