= Thomas D. Rees =

American plastic surgeon

Thomas D. Rees (February 3, 1927 – November 14, 2013) was an American plastic surgeon who co-founded the Flying Doctors Service of East Africa in 1957, an organization that utilizes small aircraft to deliver medical care to remote areas in Africa.

== Biography ==
Rees was born in Nephi, Utah. He entered the University of Utah at sixteen and graduated with a medical degree by the age of 21. He served as a U.S. Navy officer in 1945 and again from 1957 to 1958. Rees trained in general and plastic surgery at the Genesee Hospital and New York Hospital–Cornell Medical Center in Manhattan. He completed a fellowship in London under Archibald McIndoe and Harold Gillies.

In 1956, while on fellowship in London, Rees traveled to Tanzania, where he provided emergency medical treatment to a severely injured local. This experience motivated him to help establish the Flying Doctors Service of East Africa alongside Michael Wood and Archibald McIndoe.

Rees served as a professor at the New York University School of Medicine and as a president of the American Society for Aesthetic Plastic Surgery. He organized an annual symposium for plastic surgeons, which attracted participants globally. He retired in the mid-1980s due to osteoarthritis and moved to Santa Fe, where he pursued sculpting inspired by African cultures and wildlife.
