= Propellantless spacecraft propulsion =

Spacecraft propulsion without on-board reaction mass

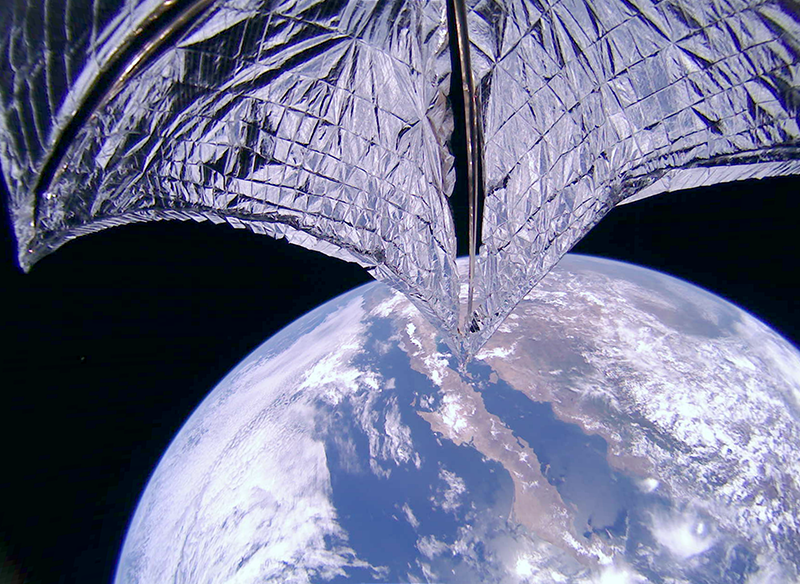
LightSail-2 with deployed solar sail in July 2019.

Propellantless spacecraft propulsion is any spacecraft propulsion system that accelerates the craft by interacting with the environment rather than expelling on-board propellant, which is the more traditional approach used by chemical and electric propulsion systems. Various physical phenomena can be exploited to achieve propulsion without propellant, most notably gravity, radiation pressure, solar wind, planetary magnetic fields or aerodynamic drag in the upper atmosphere.

Several propellantless technologies have been demonstrated in flight, while others are at varying stages of development. Aerobraking was first demonstrated around Earth by Hiten (1991), and has since been used by several interplanetary spacecraft. Solar sailing, while not widely used, has been demonstrated in flight by several spacecraft, including interplanetary ones. Space tethers of various types have also been flown on several occasions as far back as Gemini 11 (1966).

Field propulsion is a related term used by some authors to describe proposed propellantless propulsion systems, mostly in the domain of advanced propulsion concepts that would require significant theoretical or technological innovation.

Unlike reactionless propulsion, propellantless propulsion systems need not contradict the law of conservation of momentum since momentum can be exchanged with the environment.

== Applications ==
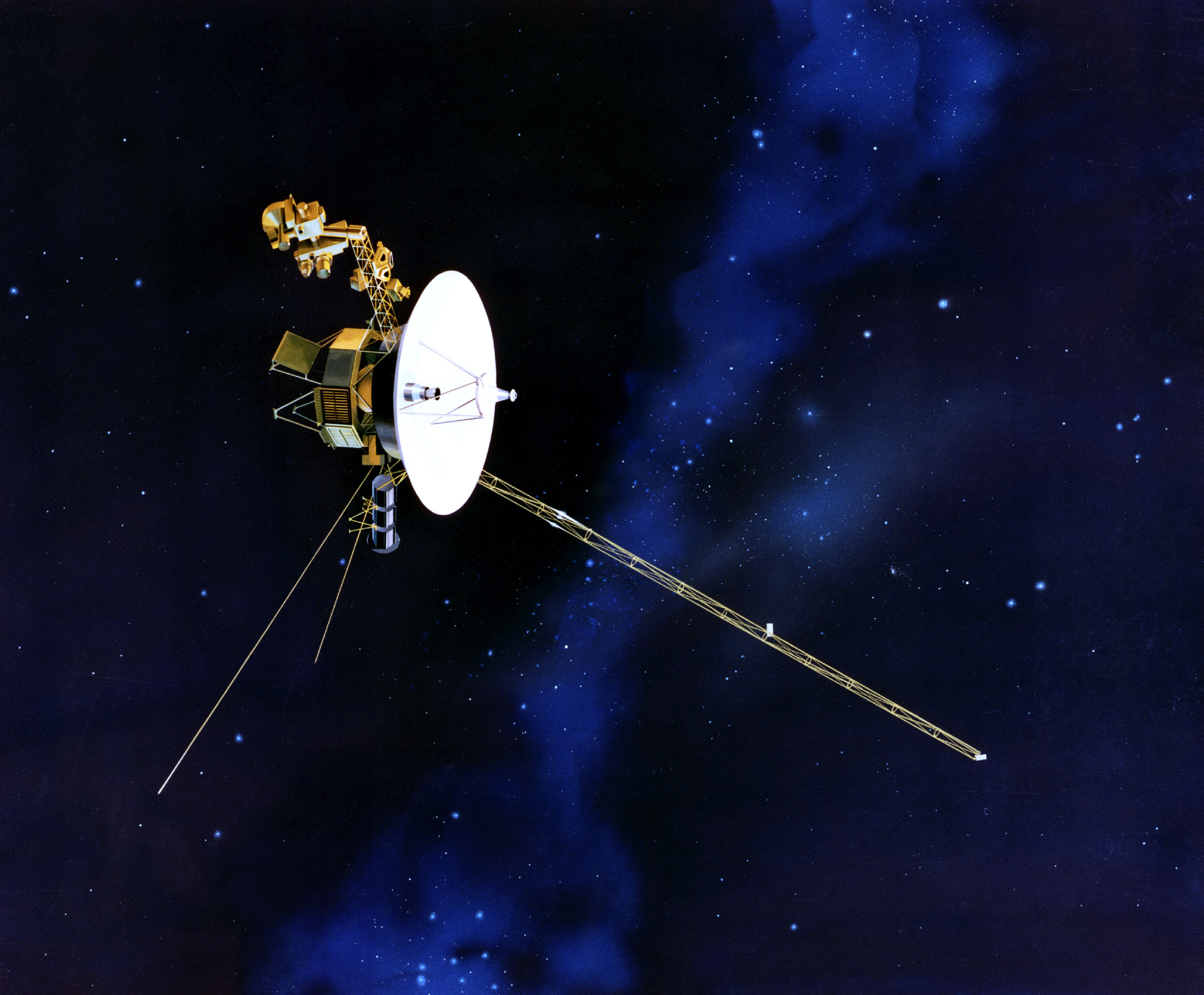
Artist's impression of a Voyager spacecraft. They are among few spacecraft that have achieved interstellar trajectories using gravity assists.

=== Interplanetary and interstellar travel ===
Traditional rockets (whether chemical or electric) accelerate a spacecraft by ejecting propellant as on-board reaction mass. While these technologies have allowed for significant progress in space exploration, they are fundamentally limited by the exhaust velocity at which the fuel can be expelled, as described by the Tsiolkovsky rocket equation. This effectively limits the total delta-v and maximum velocity that can be achieved using traditional rocketry. In particular, interstellar travel is generally considered to be impracticable with chemical rockets due to the fuel-to-payload mass ratios that would be required.

Propellantless propulsion technologies can reduce the need to carry propellant, and have been described by some authors as having effectively infinite specific impulse (or, equivalently, infinite exhaust velocity). Propellantless propulsion can therefore increase the delta-v budget available to a mission, and in some cases relativistic speeds could theoretically be achieved. As a result, the lifespan of Earth-orbiting missions or interplanetary spacecraft can be increased and, according to some authors, interstellar travel may become possible.

=== End-of-life deorbiting ===
Space debris is a topic of increasing concern, especially for low-altitude Earth orbits. Through initiatives such as ESA's Zero Debris Charter, there is increasing interest in deorbiting spacecraft by self-disposal at the end of their missions. However, an increasing number of LEO satellites are CubeSats, for which deorbit via rocket propulsion can be too heavy, expensive or even impossible due to launcher constraints (this is frequently the case for rideshare launches, which is common for CubeSats). Propellantless propulsion methods can be a cheap, lightweight alternative for end-of-life deorbiting of small spacecraft.

== Types ==
=== Demonstrated ===
Animation of Voyager 2's trajectory, including multiple gravity assists.

==== Gravity assists ====
In a gravity assist manoeuvre, also called gravitational slingshot, the gravitational attraction of a celestial body is used to change a spacecraft's trajectory. This can result in significant fuel savings for interplanetary missions.

The technique has been used by many spacecraft, perhaps most famously by Voyager 2 to visit the planets Jupiter, Saturn, Uranus and Neptune in a single mission. The very first gravity assist was performed in 1959 by Luna 3. Mariner 10 was the first interplanetary spacecraft to make use of a gravity assist, flying by Venus in 1974 to reach the planet Mercury.

Aerogravity assists are a related family of manoeuvres which would combine a gravity assist with aerobraking in order to increase its effectiveness. Aerogravity assists have yet to be demonstrated in flight.

==== Aerobraking ====
Aerobraking uses aerodynamic drag to lower a spacecraft's orbit. This has historically been used to deorbit spacecraft at the end of their operational lifetime or to adjust the apoapsis of an orbiter (often interplanetary).

First demonstrated around Earth by Hiten (1991), aerobraking is a well-established technique for interplanetary spacecraft. It was used around Venus by Magellan (1993) and Venus Express (2014) as well as around Mars by MGS (1997), Mars Odyssey (2001), MRO (2006) and TGO (2016).

The magnitude of the aerodynamic forces can be increased with deployable structures called drag sails. The concept was demonstrated by the NanoSail-D2 (2010), InflateSail (2017) and RemoveDEBRIS (2018) missions.

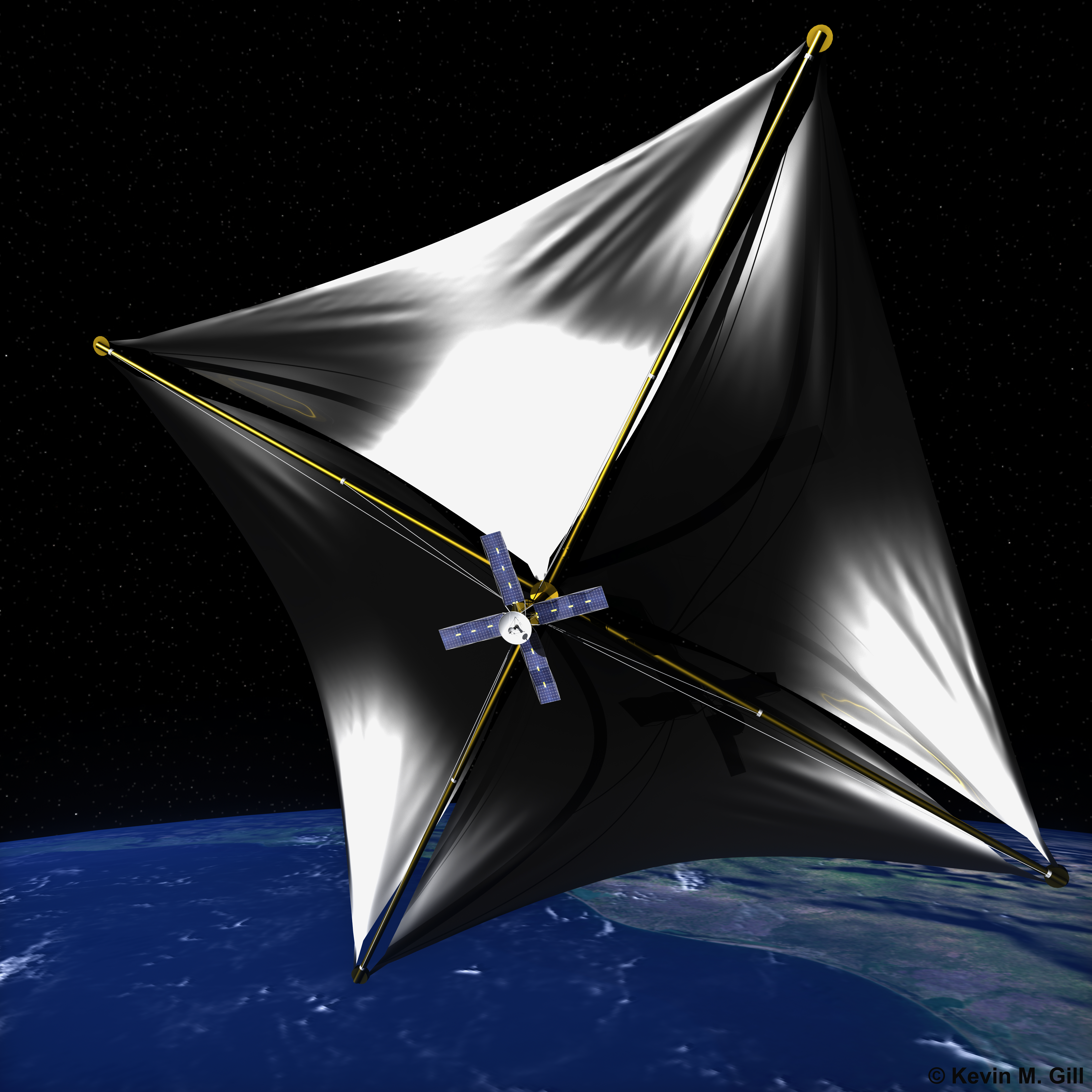
Artist's impression of a solar sail spacecraft.

==== Solar sails ====
Solar sails attempt to maximise the solar radiation pressure on the spacecraft by using lightweight materials to create a large reflective surface. While not widely used, the technology was successfully demonstrated by the interplanetary IKAROS (2010) and the Earth-orbiting LightSail-2 (2019). Given the very low thrust produced by solar radiation, solar sails are only practical for small spacecraft such as cubesats.

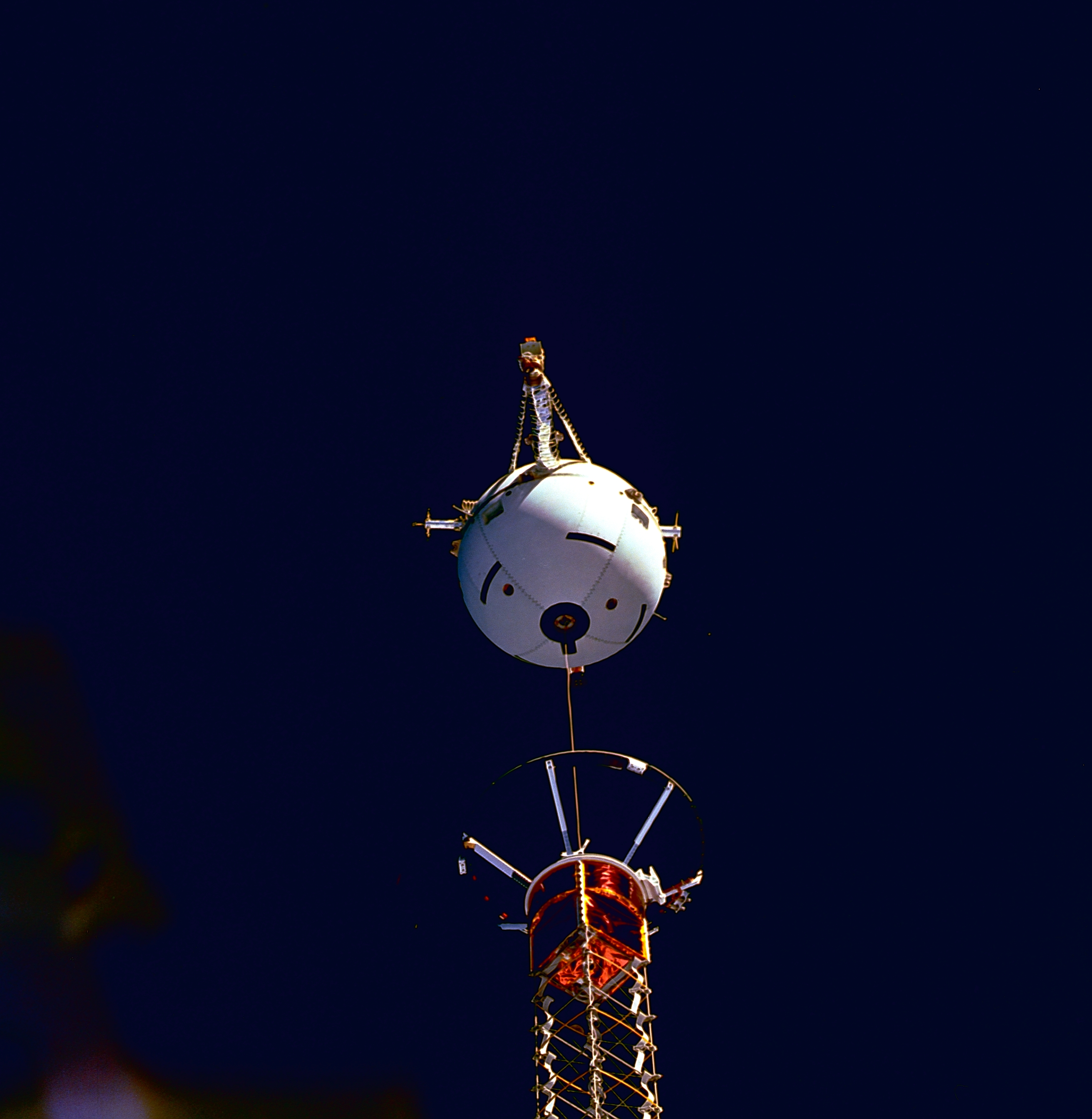
Deployment of the tethered satellite system during STS-75 in 1996.

==== Electrodynamic tethers ====
Electrodynamic tethers produce a Lorentz force by passing a current through a long tether (i.e. a wire) extended from the spacecraft to interact with the magnetic field of the planet being orbited.

=== Proposed and theorised ===
Several methods have been proposed and theorised by researchers but have yet to be flown in space; in some cases the underlying physical principle has yet to be independently reproduced.

==== Momentum exchange tethers ====
A proposed application of tethers in space is for the exchange of orbital angular momentum between spacecraft. Applications include payload deployments (such as in the skyhook concept) or orbital changes, wherein one spacecraft quickly boosts another into a higher orbit, and then recovers the lost momentum with some other, possibly slower, propulsion method.

==== Magnetic sail ====
Magnetic sails are a proposed method to generate thrust from the Lorentz force interaction between a large-scale magnetic field generated by the spacecraft and plasma (charged particles) in the surrounding environment, originating from solar wind or interstellar medium. The concept was first proposed by Robert Zubrin in 1990, and many variations have since been proposed, although the technology remains to be demonstrated in space.

A similar concept the mini-magnetospheric plasma propulsion system creates a mini-magnetosphere around a spacecraft. The plasma generation requires a small amount of propellant, but the magnetic bubble created could be much larger than the spacecraft.

==== Electric sail ====
Electric sails, or E-sails, are analogous to magnetic sails in that they exchange momentum with charged particles in the environment around the spacecraft, but they rely on electrostatic rather than magnetic forces to do so. Wires or a mesh are extended from the spacecraft and charged using an on-board electron gun to create an electric field. If the spacing of the wires is in the order of the Debye length of the surrounding plasma, the field will act as a solid barrier to the charged particles in the plasma, decelerating them and therefore transferring momentum from them into the mesh attached to the spacecraft.

Plasma brakes are a variation of the E-sail concept aimed at deorbiting small satellites, first proposed in 2010. Demonstrators were built into the ESTCube-1 (2013), Aalto-1 (2017), FORESAIL-1 (2022), and ESTCube-2 (2023) cubesats; due to various reasons, none have successfully deployed. Another demonstrator was launched aboard the FORESAIL-1p cubesat, launched in November 2025. As of June 2026, no successful demonstration has been performed in space.

==== Laser-propelled sail ====
Like solar sails, laser-propelled sails are a form of photon propulsion. However, whereas solar sails use light emitted from the Sun, a laser-propelled sail would use artificially-produced light coming from a ground-based or spaceborne laser array.

The Breakthrough Starshot project, announced in 2016, aimed to build an interstellar satellite using a laser-propelled sail. As of 2025, the project was reported to be indefinitely on hold.

==== Photon rocket ====
A photon rocket produces thrust by emitting large quantities of electromagnetic radiation. By the law of conservation of momentum, the momentum of the emitted photons is balanced by a change in the momentum of the spacecraft, thus producing thrust. Such devices are considered impractical.

==== Field propulsion ====
Field propulsion is a term used by some authors to categorize speculative proposals for advanced propulsion systems which would require significant research or new fundamental physics to come to fruition. Examples include plasma thrusters, magnetoplasmadynamic thrusters and similar devices. As of 1996, no such field propulsion system has been experimentally validated.

== In popular culture ==
The 1964 short story Sunjammer by Arthur C. Clarke depicts a yacht race between solar sail spacecraft. The Sunjammer spacecraft, originally set to launch in 2015 but cancelled in 2014, was named in honour of this story.

In the 2014 novel The Martian by Andy Weir, the rescue mission performs a gravity assist around Earth.

In the 2016 science-fiction novel Revenger by Alastair Reynolds and its sequels, solar sails are a prominent propulsion method for spacecraft.

In the 2021 book Project Hail Mary by Andy Weir and its 2026 film adaptation, the titular spacecraft features a photon rocket, since its primary method for propulsion is the emission of high-intensity IR light.

== See also ==
- Spacecraft propulsion – Method used to accelerate spacecraft
- Rocket – Vehicle propelled by ejection of gases
- Electric propulsion – Type of spacecraft propulsion using electrical energy to accelerate propellant
- Space tether – Load bearing cable connecting objects in space
- Field propulsion – Propulsion concepts and technologies
- Interstellar travel – Hypothetical travel between stars or planetary systems
