= Oxford Instruments =

United Kingdom manufacturing and research company

Oxford Instruments plc
- Company type: Public limited company
- Traded as: LSE: OXIG; FTSE 250 component
- ISIN: GB0006650450
- Industry: Top level markets include materials analysis, semiconductors, and healthcare and life science
- Founded: 1959
- Headquarters: High Wycombe, Buckinghamshire
- Key people: Neil Carson (Chairman); Richard Tyson (CEO); Paul Fry (CFO)
- Products: Analysers; Atomic force microscopes; Cryogenic systems; CT & MRI systems, maintenance & parts; Electron spectroscopes; Microanalysis systems; Nanoindentation systems; Nanomanipulation & nanofabrication; Plasma, ALD & ion beam; Raman microscopes; Scanning probe microscopes; Scientific cameras; Spectrometers; Superconducting magnets; X-ray tubes and integrated sources
- Revenue: ▼£423.2 million (2026)
- Operating income: ▼£73.7 million (2026)
- Net income: ▲£48.2 million (2026)
- Website: www.oxinst.com

Oxford Instruments plc is a United Kingdom manufacturing and research company that designs and manufactures tools and systems for industry and research. The company is headquartered in High Wycombe, Buckinghamshire, England, with sites in the United Kingdom, United States, Europe, and Asia. It is listed on the London Stock Exchange and is a constituent of the FTSE 250 Index.

== History ==
The company was founded by Sir Martin Wood in 1959, with help from his wife Audrey Wood (Lady Wood) to manufacture superconducting magnets for use in scientific research, starting in his garden shed in Northmoor Road, Oxford, England. It was the first substantial commercial spin-out company from the University of Oxford and was first listed on the London Stock Exchange in 1983. Peter Williams took over as CEO at the time of the flotation.

It had a pioneering role in the development of magnetic resonance imaging, providing the first superconducting magnets for this application. The first commercial MRI whole body scanner was manufactured at its Osney Mead factory in Oxford in 1980 for installation at Hammersmith Hospital, London.

Further innovations included the development of active shielding, whereby fringe fields hazardous to pacemaker wearers, causing difficulty and expense in siting, were virtually eliminated. Oxford Instruments was not able to capitalise on these inventions itself, granting royalty-free license to Philips and General Electric whilst developing a joint venture with Siemens in 1989: Oxford Instruments sold its 49% shareholding to Siemens in 2003.

Andrew Mackintosh was appointed CEO in 1998. He was replaced as CEO by Jonathan Flint, who later became president of the Institute of Physics, in 2005. Ian Barkshire, who had spent much of his career with the company, took over as CEO in 2016.

In November 2019, the History of Science Museum in Broad Street established a section on instruments made by the company.

The company was the target of a takeover approach by Spectris in 2022: Spectris eventually terminated its interest due to market uncertainty.

Richard Tyson joined the company from TT Electronics and was appointed CEO in April 2023.

In June 2025, the company agreed to sell its quantum-focussed subsidiary, NanoScience, for £60 million. The sale of a business at the cutting edge of technology was not well-received by the market and led to a sharp fall in share price.

== Acquisitions and divestitures ==
Divestitures

- 2003 Oxford Magnet Technology Ltd, minority shareholding sold to Siemens plc
- 2016 Superconducting Wire business sold to Bruker.

Acquisitions

- 2003 Thermo VC Semicon Ltd. Molecular beam epitaxy (MBE) equipment for semiconductor fabrication
- 2005 HKL Technology A/S. EBSD detector technology for electron microscopy
- 2008 Link Analytical AB. Sales channel for Oxford Instruments in Scandinavia
- 2012 Asylum Research Corp. Scanning probe microscopes for industry and research
- 2014 Andor Technology plc. Scientific cameras, spectrometers and high speed fluorescence microscopes
- 2021 WITec Wissenschaftliche Instrumente & Technologie GmbH. Raman imaging microscopes
- 2024 FemtoTools AG. MEMS-based nanoindenters

== Activities ==
The company designs and manufactures products to image, analyse and manipulate materials. It operates an innovation centre in High Wycombe where it carries out advanced material analysis.

Some of the equipment manufactured and sold by the company is capable of atomic and molecular analysis.

The company is organised into two divisions: Imaging & Analysis and Advanced Technologies.
