= Githinji Gitahi =

Kenyan medical doctor

Dr. Gìthìnji Gìtahi
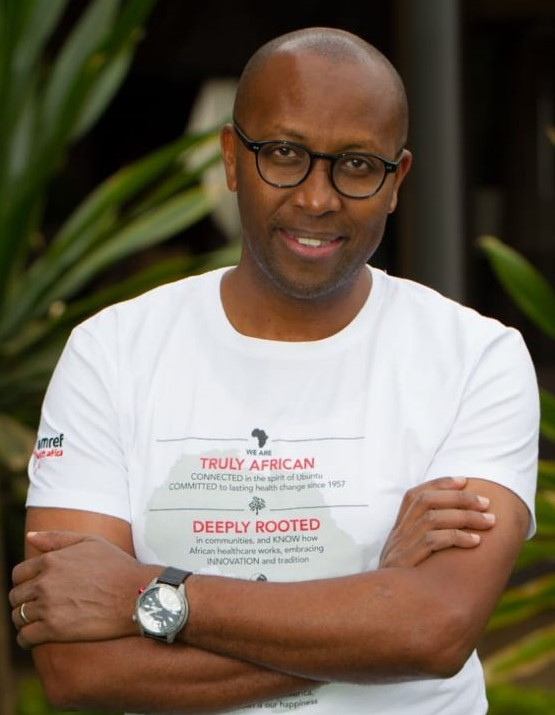
- Dr. Githinji Gihati

Group Chief Executive Officer at Amref Health Africa Group

Personal details
- Born: Gìthìnji Gìtahi; 7 August 1970 (age 56) Othaya Village, Nyeri County
- Relatives: Stephen Kiama (brother)
- Education: University of Nairobi (Bachelor of Medicine and Surgery), (Master in Marketing), Harvard University (Certificate for Strategic Perspective for Nonprofit MGT)
- Occupation: Physician researcher and public administrator
- Known for: Public administration

Gìthìnji Gìtahi (born 7 August 1970) is a Kenyan medical doctor who serves as the Global Chief Executive Officer of Amref Health Africa as well a former co-chair of the UHC2030 Steering Committee. In July 2021, he was appointed as a Commissioner in the Africa COVID-19 Commission.

== Early life and education ==
Gìthìnji was born on 7 August 1970 in Othaya, Nyeri County, Kenya. In 1996, he graduated from University of Nairobi with a Bachelor of Medicine and surgery and a Masters degree of Business Administration in Marketing from United States International University (on going). He holds a Certificate for Strategic Perspective for Non Profit Management from Harvard University.

== Career ==
Gìtahi has worked both in public and private sector in various positions such as a medical officer and Quality Manager at Avenue Group (1996-2000), as a Medical Services Manager at Madison Insurance Limited (2000-2001), as a medical Medical Marketing Manager and Group Product Manager for Panadol and Hedex at Glaxo SmithKline (2001-2004), as a Marketing Manager at Glaxo SmithKline East Africa (2005-2006) as the Head of Marketing Expert Relations at Glaxo SmithKline Sub-Saharan Africa and Middle East (October 2006-August 2007).

From August 2006 to 2009, Gìtahi was the Managing Director for Monitor Publications Limited in Uganda as well as General Manager for Marketing and Circulation in East Africa for the Nation Media Group (August 2009-December 2011). Between March 2008 to December 2001, he held senior positions at GlaxoSmithKline and worked at the Avenue Group.

Gìtahi currently serves as Global Chief Executive Officer of Amref Health Africa since June 2015. He is co-chair of the UHC2030 Steering Committee. He has presented as a speaker at medical conferences both inside and outside Africa such as Health Systems Global Symposium 2018, and Health & Climate Change conference 2019.

In 2023, United Nations Secretary-General António Guterres appointed Gìtahi as one of 22 member of the Scaling Up Nutrition (SUN) Movement's lead group.

== Other activities ==
- World Health Organization, Member of the Community Health Worker Hub
- Africa Centres for Disease Control and Prevention (Africa CDC), Member of the Governing Board, Member of the Private Sector Advisory Board
- Coalition for Epidemic Preparedness Innovations (CEPI), Member of the Board and Scientific Advisory Committee (since 2022)
- Standard Group, Member of the Board of Directors
- Safaricom Foundation, Member of the Board of Trustees
- WomenLift Health, Member of the Global Advisory Board

== Honors ==
On 12 December 2018, Gìthìnji was awarded a presidential commendation of Moran of the Order of the Burning Spear in recognition for his contribution to the health sector at Amref Health Africa.

== Personal life ==
Gìthìnji is a brother to Stephen Kiama the Vice Chancellor at University of Nairobi.
