= Coupling (physics) =

Two systems are coupled if they are interacting with each other

In physics, coupling is when two objects are interacting with each other, that is they are not independent. In classical mechanics, coupling is a connection between two oscillating systems, such as pendulums connected by a spring. The connection affects the oscillatory pattern of both objects. In particle physics, two particles are coupled if they are connected by one of the four fundamental forces.

== Wave mechanics ==
=== Coupled harmonic oscillator ===
Coupled pendulums connected by a spring

If two waves are able to transmit energy to each other, then these waves are said to be "coupled." This normally occurs when the waves share a common component. An example of this is two pendulums connected by a spring. If the pendulums are identical, then their equations of motion are given by
$$m\ddot{x} = -mg\frac{x}{l_1} - k(x-y)$$
$$m\ddot{y} = -mg \frac{y}{l_2} + k(x-y)$$

These equations represent the simple harmonic motion of the pendulum with an added coupling factor of the spring. This behavior is also seen in certain molecules (such as CO_{2} and H_{2}O), wherein two of the atoms will vibrate around a central one in a similar manner.

=== Coupled LC circuits ===
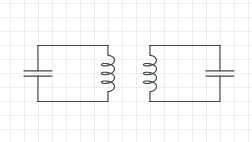
Two LC circuits coupled together.

In LC circuits, charge oscillates between the capacitor and the inductor and can therefore be modeled as a simple harmonic oscillator. When the magnetic flux from one inductor is able to affect the inductance of an inductor in an unconnected LC circuit, the circuits are said to be coupled. The coefficient of coupling k defines how closely the two circuits are coupled and is given by the equation
$$\frac{M}{\sqrt{L_p L_s}} = k$$

where M is the mutual inductance of the circuits and L_{p} and L_{s} are the inductances of the primary and secondary circuits, respectively. If the flux lines of the primary inductor thread every line of the secondary one, then the coefficient of coupling is 1 and $M = \sqrt{L_p L_s}$ In practice, however, there is often leakage, so most systems are not perfectly coupled.

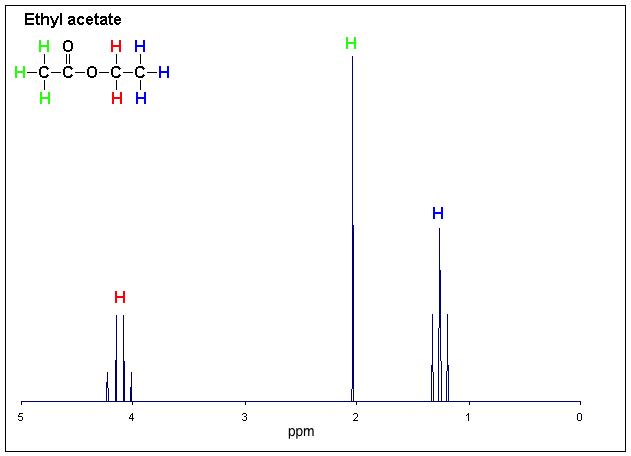
Peaks in an NMR image of Ethyl Acetate.

== Chemistry ==
=== Spin-spin coupling ===
Spin-spin coupling occurs when the magnetic field of one atom affects the magnetic field of another nearby atom. This is very common in NMR imaging. If two atoms are not coupled, then there will be two individual peaks, called singlets, representing the individual atoms. If coupling is present, then the peaks of each atom will split according to number of coupling atoms and their respective spins. This occurs due to the spins of the individual atoms oscillating in tandem.

== Astrophysics ==
Objects in space which are coupled to each other are under the mutual influence of each other's gravity. For instance, the Earth is coupled to both the Sun and the Moon, as it is under the gravitational influence of both. Common in space are binary systems, two objects gravitationally coupled to each other. Examples of this are binary stars which circle each other. Multiple objects may also be coupled to each other simultaneously, such as with globular clusters and galaxy groups. When smaller particles, such as dust, which are coupled together over time accumulate into much larger objects, accretion is occurring. This is the major process by which stars and planets form.

== Plasma ==
The coupling constant of a plasma is given by the ratio of its average Coulomb-interaction energy to its average kinetic energy—or how strongly the electric force of each atom holds the plasma together. Plasmas can therefore be categorized into weakly- and strongly-coupled plasmas depending upon the value of this ratio. Many of the typical classical plasmas, such as the plasma in the solar corona, are weakly coupled, while the plasma in a white dwarf star is an example of a strongly coupled plasma.

== Quantum mechanics ==
Two coupled quantum systems can be modeled by a Hamiltonian of the form

Dispersion relations for non-coupled, weakly-coupled, and strongly-coupled particles

$$\hat{H} = \hat{H}_a + \hat{H}_b + \hat{V}_{ab}$$
which is the addition of the two Hamiltonians in isolation with an added interaction factor. In most simple systems, $\hat{H}_a$ and $\hat{H}_b$ can be solved exactly while $\hat{V}_{ab}$ can be solved through perturbation theory. If the two systems have similar total energy, then the system may undergo Rabi oscillation.

=== Angular momentum coupling ===
When angular momenta from two separate sources interact with each other, they are said to be coupled. For example, two electrons orbiting around the same nucleus may have coupled angular momenta. Due to the conservation of angular momentum and the nature of the angular momentum operator, the total angular momentum is always the sum of the individual angular momenta of the electrons, or
$$\mathbf{J}=\mathbf{J_1}+\mathbf{J_2}$$
Spin-Orbit interaction (also known as spin-orbit coupling) is a special case of angular momentum coupling. Specifically, it is the interaction between the intrinsic spin of a particle, S, and its orbital angular momentum, L. As they are both forms of angular momentum, they must be conserved. Even if energy is transferred between the two, the total angular momentum, J, of the system must be constant, $\mathbf{J}=\mathbf{L}+\mathbf{S}$.

== Particle physics and quantum field theory ==
Examples of gluon coupling

Particles which interact with each other are said to be coupled. This interaction is caused by one of the fundamental forces, whose strengths are usually given by a dimensionless coupling constant. In quantum electrodynamics, this value is known as the fine-structure constant α, approximately equal to 1/137. For quantum chromodynamics, the constant changes with respect to the distance between the particles. This phenomenon is known as asymptotic freedom. Forces which have a coupling constant greater than 1 are said to be "strongly coupled" while those with constants less than 1 are said to be "weakly coupled."
