= Amref Health Africa =

Non-profit organisation

- Formation: 1957
- Founder: Archibald McIndoe; Sir Michael Wood; Tom Rees
- Location(s): International HQ: Nairobi, Kenya
- Origins: East Africa
- Region served: Africa
- Members: 12
- Group Chief Executive Officer (GCEO): Githinji Gitahi
- Revenue: $255m
- Employees: 2100
- Volunteers: 0
- Website: amref.org
- Formerly called: African Medical and Research Foundation (AMREF)

Amref Health Africa is a Kenyan-based non-governmental organization focused on providing community and environmental healthcare to countries in Africa. It is considered one of the most prominent health NGOs in Africa.

== History ==
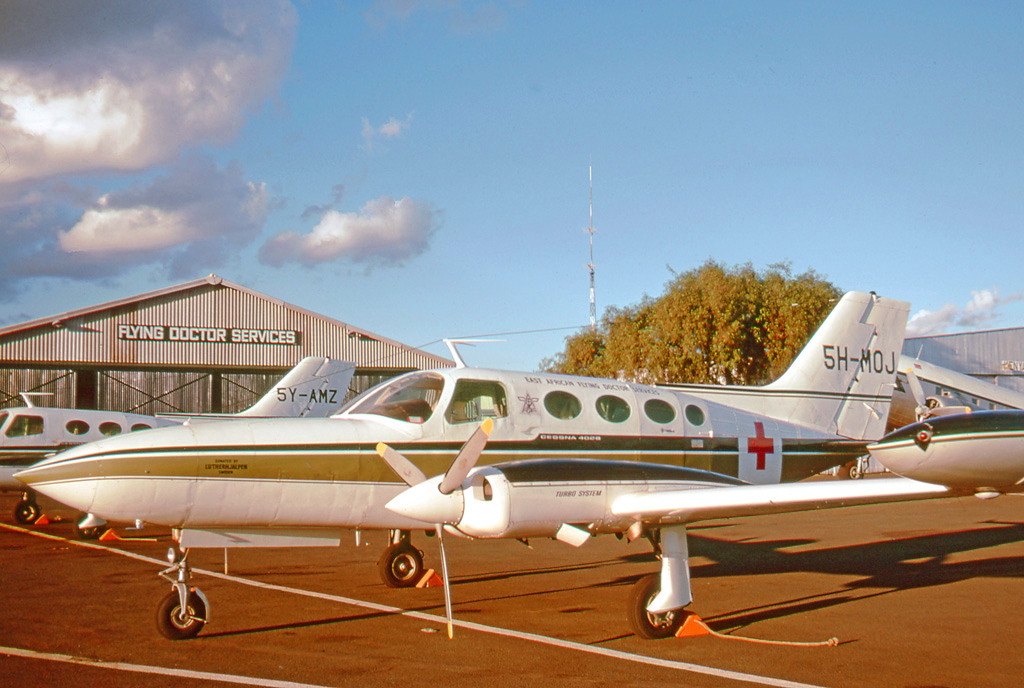
East African Flying Doctor Service Cessna 402B at its Nairobi (Wilson) Airport base in 1973

Originally known as The Flying Doctors of East Africa, Amref was founded in 1957 by Sir Archibald McIndoe, Sir Michael Wood and Dr. Thomas D. Rees. While its original focus was to provide health services to patients in remote areas, they began providing education to other Africa-based health workers as early as the 1970s.

During the 1980s and 90s, Amref expanded in scope, collaborating with other international aid agencies and working directly with the Ministries of Health in Tanzania, Kenya and Uganda on community health based projects, with a focus on the prevention of HIV/AIDS.

In the 2000s and 2010s, Amref performed thousands of reconstructive surgeries on Africans with cleft lip and cleft palate (CLP) alongside the non-profit organization Smile Train.

On August 7, 2025 a Cessna Citation XLS operated by Amref crashed into a house in Mwihoko, Kiambu County, killing four people on board the aircraft and two others inside the house.

== The Flying Doctors of East Africa (film) ==
In 1969, Amref was the subject of a documentary short by director Werner Herzog named The Flying Doctors of East Africa. This was still the name of the organization at the time. Shooting took place on location in Tanzania and Kenya. According to Herzog, the film was successful in bringing publicity to the organization in its early days.

== See also ==
- Clinical officers, healthcare providers in Sub-Saharan Africa
- Healthcare in Kenya

== Leadership ==
- Group Chief Executive Officer: Githinji Gitahi,
- Group Chief Finance Director: Jennifer Peng
- Group Human Capital Director: Angela Muchiru
- Group Director, Fundraising and Development: Guglielmo Micucci
- Group Partnership and external Affairs Director: Desta Lakew
- Group Director, ICT: Samuel Weru
- Chief of Staff: Lolem B. Ngong
- Amref UK CEO: Camilla Knox-Peebles
- Amref USA CEO: Robert Kelty
- Amref West Africa regional manager: Awa Dieye Dieng
- Amref Kenya Country Director: Ndirangu Wanjuki
