= Chaplygin =

Chaplygin (masculine) or Chaplygina (feminine; also masculine genitive) may refer to:

People

- Sergey Chaplygin (1869–1942), Russian/Soviet physicist
- Stanislav Chaplygin (b. 1967), retired Russian professional association football player
- Valery Chaplygin (b. 1952), Soviet Olympic cyclist
- Yury Chaplygin, Russian academician

Places

- Chaplygin Urban Settlement, a municipal formation which Chaplygin Town Under District Jurisdiction in Chaplyginsky District of Lipetsk Oblast is incorporated as
- Chaplygin (inhabited locality) (Chaplygina), several inhabited localities in Russia
- Chaplygin (crater), a lunar crater named after Sergey Chaplygin
- 4032 Chaplygin, a minor planet

== See also ==
- Chaplygin gas
- Chaplygin problem
- Chaplygin sleigh
- Chaplygin's equation
- Chaplyginsky District
