= Chaplygin (inhabited locality) =

Chaplygin (Russian: Чаплыгин, masculine) or Chaplygina (feminine or masculine genitive) is the name of several inhabited localities in Russia.

Urban localities

- Chaplygin, Lipetsk Oblast, a town in Chaplyginsky District of Lipetsk Oblast; administratively incorporated as a town under district jurisdiction

Rural localities

- Chaplygin, Krasnodar Krai, a khutor in Soyuz Chetyrekh Khutorov Rural Okrug of Gulkevichsky District of Krasnodar Krai
- Chaplygina, Kursk Oblast, a village in Pashkovsky Selsoviet of Kursky District of Kursk Oblast
- Chaplygina, Oryol Oblast, a village in Bagrinovsky Selsoviet of Bolkhovsky District of Oryol Oblast
