= Polyanin =

Polyanin (Russian: Полянин, from поляна meaning meadow) is a Russian masculine surname, its feminine counterpart is Polyanina. It may refer to

- Andrei Polyanin (born 1951), Russian mathematician
- Dmitri Polyanin (born 1980), Russian football player
