= Andrei Polyanin =

Russian mathematician (born 1951)

Andrei D. Polyanin
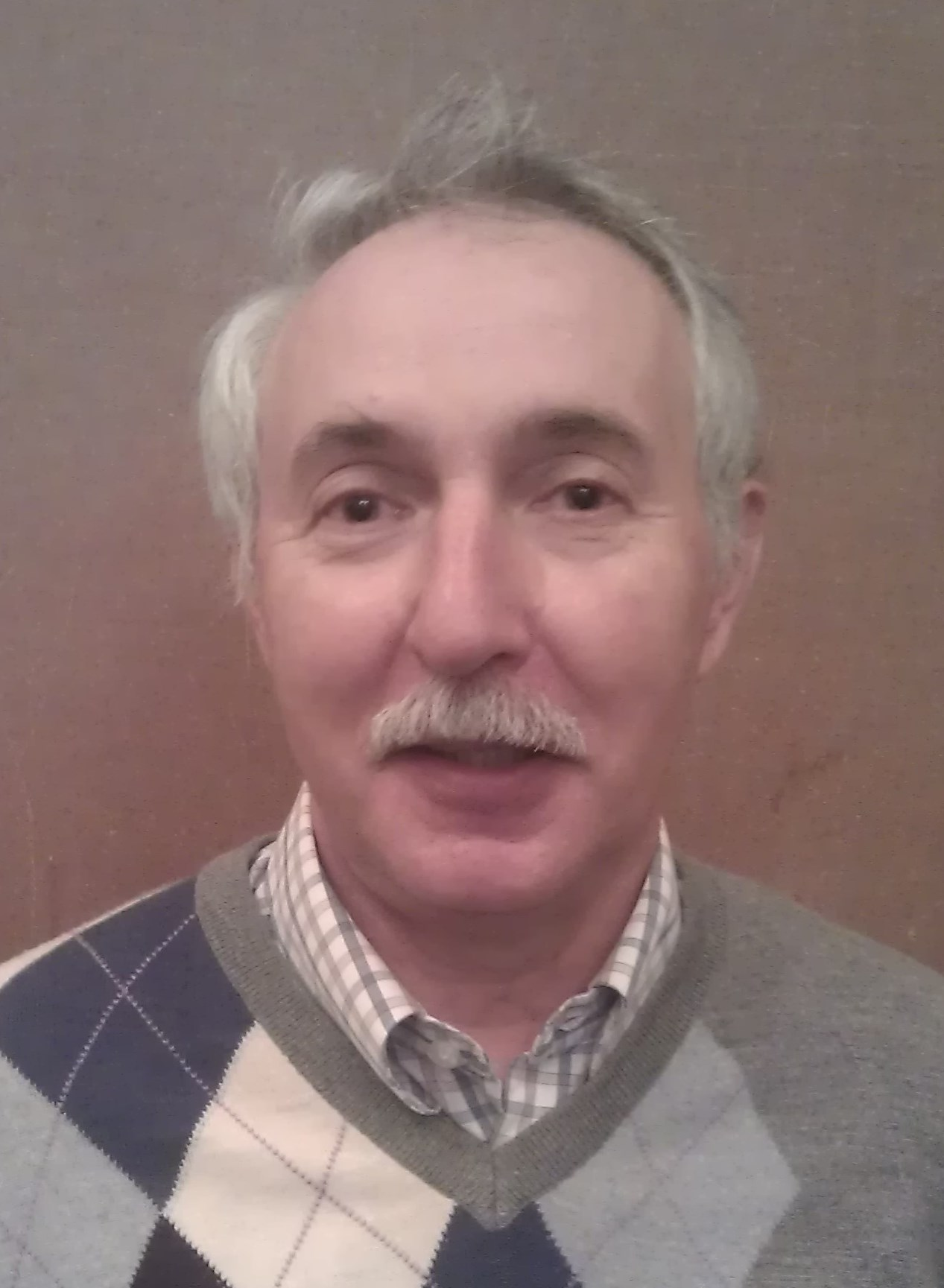
- Polyanin in 2013
- Born: 1 November 1951 (age 74); Beijing, China
- Education: Lomonosov Moscow State University
- Known for: Handbooks of ordinary differential, partial differential and integral equations, EqWorld
- Scientific career
- Fields: Differential equations, Integral equations, Mathematical physics, Fluid mechanics, Mass and heat transfer, Chemical engineering science, Engineering mathematics
- Workplaces: Institute for Problems in Mechanics of the Russian Academy of Sciences

Andrei Dmitrievich Polyanin (Russian: Андрей Дмитриевич Полянин; born 1 November 1951) is a Russian mathematician. He is a creator and Editor-in-Chief of EqWorld.

== Education ==
Polyanin graduated with honors from the Faculty of Mechanics and Mathematics at Lomonosov Moscow State University in 1974 (M.Sc.). He received his Ph.D. in 1981 and D.Sc. in 1986 (mathematics and physics) at the Institute for Problems in Mechanics of the Russian Academy of Sciences.

== Professional career and membership ==
Polyanin has been working at the Institute for Problems in Mechanics of the Russian Academy of Sciences since 1975 (professor since 1991). In 2004, he also became professor of mathematics at Bauman Moscow State Technical University. He is member of the Russian National Committee on Theoretical and Applied Mechanics and the Mathematics and Mechanics Expert Council of the Higher Attestation Commission of the Russian Federation. He is editor of the book series Differential and Integral Equations and Their Applications (Chapman & Hall – CRC Press, London – Boca Raton) and member of the editorial board of the journal Theoretical Foundations of Chemical Engineering.

== Interests and achievements ==
Polyanin is a scientist with broad interests who has made significant contribution to the theory of differential and integral equations, mathematical physics, applied and engineering mathematics, fluid mechanics, theory of heat and mass transfer, and chemical engineering sciences. He has also contributed to the development of a number of new exact and approximate analytical methods for mathematics and engineering sciences, including the methods of generalized and functional separation of variables, discrete group approach, functional constraints method, asymptotic analogies method, model equations method, and others. He has obtained exact solutions for several thousand ordinary differential, partial differential, delay partial differential, integral and functional equations.

Polyanin is the author of more than 30 books in English, Russian, German, and Bulgarian as well as over 160 research papers and three patents. He is known in the scientific community for his fundamental series of handbooks on differential and integral equations; many of the results included in these books were obtained by him personally.

In 1991, Polyanin was awarded a Chaplygin Prize of the Russian Academy of Sciences for his research in mechanics. In 2001, he received an award from the Ministry of Education of the Russian Federation.

== Major books ==
- Polyanin, A. D.; Zaitsev, V. F. (2017). Handbook of Ordinary Differential Equations: Exact Solutions, Methods, and Problems (3rd ed.). Taylor & Francis Inc. ISBN 1466569379.
- Polyanin, A. D.; Zaitsev, V. F. (2012). Handbook of nonlinear partial differential equations (2nd ed.). Boca Raton–London: Chapman & Hall/CRC Press. ISBN 1420087231.
- Polyanin, A. D.; Chernoutsan, A. I., eds. (2010). A concise handbook of mathematics, physics, and engineering sciences. Boca Raton–London: Chapman & Hall/CRC Press. ISBN 143980639X.
- Polyanin, A. D.; Manzhirov, A. V. (2008). Handbook of integral equations (2nd ed.). Boca Raton–London: Chapman & Hall/CRC Press. ISBN 0203881052.
- Polyanin, A. D.; Manzhirov, A. V. (2007). Handbook of mathematics for engineers and scientists. Boca Raton–London: Chapman & Hall/CRC Press. ISBN 1584885025.
- Polyanin, A. D.; Zaitsev, V. F. (2003). Handbook of exact solutions for ordinary differential equations (2nd ed.). Boca Raton–New York: CRC Press. ISBN 1584882972.
- Polyanin, A. D. (2002). Handbook of linear partial differential equations for engineers and scientists. Boca Raton–London: Chapman & Hall/CRC Press. ISBN 1584882999.
- Polyanin, A. D.; Zaitsev, V. F.; Moussiaux, A. (2002). Handbook of first order partial differential equations. London: Taylor & Francis. ISBN 041527267X.
- Polyanin, A. D.; Kutepov, A. M.; Kazenin, D. A.; Vyazmin, A. V. (2002). Hydrodynamics, mass and heat transfer in chemical engineering. London: Taylor & Francis. ISBN 0415272378.
- Polyanin, A. D.; Dilman, V. V. (1994). Methods of modeling equations and analogies in chemical engineering. Boca Raton–Ann Arbor: CRC Press/Begell House. ISBN 0849399149.
- Zaitsev, V. F.; Polyanin, A. D. (1994). Discrete-group methods for integrating equations of nonlinear mechanics. Boca Raton–Ann Arbor: CRC Press/Begell House. ISBN 0849399165.
