= Hill's spherical vortex =

Hill's spherical vortex is an exact solution of the Euler equations that is commonly used to model a vortex ring. The solution is also used to model the velocity distribution inside a spherical drop of one fluid moving at a constant velocity through another fluid at small Reynolds number. The vortex is named after Micaiah John Muller Hill who discovered the exact solution in 1894. The two-dimensional analogue of this vortex is the Lamb–Chaplygin dipole.

The solution is described in the spherical polar coordinates system $(r,\theta,\phi)$ with corresponding velocity components $(v_r,v_\theta,0)$. The velocity components are identified from Stokes stream function $\psi(r,\theta)$ as follows

$$v_r = \frac{1}{r^2\sin\theta}\frac{\partial\psi}{\partial\theta}, \quad v_\theta = - \frac{1}{r\sin\theta}\frac{\partial\psi}{\partial r}.$$

The Hill's spherical vortex is described by

$$\psi=\begin{cases}-\frac{3U}{4} \left(1-\frac{r^2}{a^2}\right) r^2\sin^2\theta \quad \text{in} \quad r\leq a\\
\frac{U}{2} \left(1 - \frac{a^3}{r^3}\right)r^2\sin^2\theta \quad \text{in} \quad r\geq a
\end{cases}$$

where $U$ is a constant freestream velocity far away from the origin and $a$ is the radius of the sphere within which the vorticity is non-zero. For $r\geq a$, the vorticity is zero and the solution described above in that range is nothing but the potential flow past a sphere of radius $a$. The only non-zero vorticity component for $r\leq a$ is the azimuthal component that is given by

$$\omega_\phi = -\frac{15 U}{2a^2} r\sin\theta.$$

Note that here the parameters $U$ and $a$ can be scaled out by non-dimensionalization.

== Hill's spherical vortex with a swirling motion ==
The Hill's spherical vortex with a swirling motion is provided by Keith Moffatt in 1969. Earlier discussion of similar problems are provided by William Mitchinson Hicks in 1899. The solution was also discovered by Kelvin H. Pendergast in 1956, in the context of plasma physics, as there exists a direct connection between these fluid flows and plasma physics (see the connection between Hicks equation and Grad–Shafranov equation). The motion $(v_r,v_\theta,v_\phi)$ in the axial (or, meridional) plane is described by the Stokes stream function $\psi$ as before. The azimuthal motion $v_\phi$ is given by

$$v_\phi = \frac{\pm k\psi}{r\sin\theta}$$

where

$$\psi=\begin{cases} -\frac{3U}{2}\frac{J_{3/2}(ka)}{J_{5/2}(ka)}\left[\left(\frac{a}{r}\right)^{3/2}\frac{J_{3/2}(kr)}{J_{3/2}(ka)}-1\right] r^2\sin^2\theta \quad \text{in} \quad r\leq a\\
\frac{U}{2} \left(1 - \frac{a^3}{r^3}\right)r^2\sin^2\theta \quad \text{in} \quad r\geq a
\end{cases}$$

where $J_{3/2}$ and $J_{5/2}$ are the Bessel functions of the first kind. Unlike the Hill's spherical vortex without any swirling motion, the problem here contains an arbitrary parameter $ka$. A general class of solutions of the Euler's equation describing propagating three-dimensional vortices without change of shape is provided by Keith Moffatt in 1986.
