= Jamie Farnes =

English astrophysicist (born 1984)

- Born: 1984 (age 41–42); Cornwall, England
- Education: University of Cambridge
- Scientific career
- Fields: Physics (astrophysics)
- Workplaces: University of Oxford

Jamie S. Farnes (born 1984) is a British cosmologist, astrophysicist and radio astronomer based at the University of Oxford. He studies dark energy, dark matter, cosmic magnetic fields and the large-scale structure of the universe. In 2018, it was announced by Oxford that Farnes may have simultaneously solved both the dark energy and dark matter problems, using a new negative mass dark fluid toy model that "brings balance to the universe".

In 2019, the Farnes Universe was listed as one of the top 10 dark matter candidates.

== Education ==
Farnes was born in Cornwall, England, UK. He attended Saltash Community School, studied at Royal Holloway graduating with a BSc with first class honours in theoretical physics (2008), followed by a PhD in astrophysics from the Cavendish Laboratory at the University of Cambridge (2012). Farnes was also a member of the Kavli Institute for Cosmology and studied at Trinity Hall College where Stephen Hawking had previously completed his PhD.

== Career ==
From 2012 to 2015, Farnes was an Associate Lecturer at the University of Sydney and within the ARC Centre of Excellence for All-Sky Astrophysics. In 2015 he briefly moved to the Arcetri Astrophysical Observatory, before he took up an appointment as an Excellence Fellow at Radboud University Nijmegen.

In 2017, he moved back to the UK as a Research Associate at the Oxford e-Research Centre within the Department of Engineering Science at the University of Oxford.

In 2019, it was reported that Farnes has since moved on to Faculty, a leading Artificial Intelligence company.

Farnes' current work is on the development of science pipelines for the Square Kilometre Array, a next-generation radio telescope that will generate 5 zettabytes (5 million petabytes) of data each year – a data rate equivalent to 5 times the estimated global internet traffic in 2015. Farnes is a member of two SKA Science Working Groups.

Farnes is also a member of the Executive Committee for the POSSUM survey with the Australian Square Kilometre Array Pathfinder, on the Board of the Very Large Array Survey Science Group and co-chair of the Extragalactic Working Group to map the radio universe, and a core member of the LOFAR telescope based in the Netherlands He is engaged in public engagement and has written articles for The Conversation, communicated his work in interviews over the Periscope platform, and previously run the CAASTRO in the Classroom program funded by the Australian Research Council.

== Research ==
In 2014, Farnes created a "rainbow of radio data" to solve a problem about whether magnetic fields in space are intrinsic to radio-wave emitting galaxies or quasars, or whether they are much closer to Earth—in intervening gas clouds. Farnes and his colleagues were able to show that the magnetic field is usually related to the galaxy or quasar itself and were able to discern the different effects of the core of the galaxy or quasar, and of its radio-emitting 'lobes'.

In 2015, he and Bryan Gaensler calculated that the cosmic magnetic fields in ancient galaxies are much stronger than was previously believed, requiring "magnetic fields to be the same strength 7 billion years ago as they are today" In 2017, the American Astronomical Society announced that Farnes had used the Very Large Array to make the first detailed study of the evolution of protogalaxies in the early universe and came up with a creative alternative which suggests that a more exotic dynamo theory must be at play throughout the cosmos.

In 2018, it was reported across international media that Farnes may have solved the mystery of dark energy and dark matter by unifying them into a dark fluid with negative mass. This work reinvoked the creation tensor previously suggested by Fred Hoyle, but only for negative masses.

== Cosmological model ==
Farnes published a peer-reviewed scientific paper in the journal Astronomy & Astrophysics that makes use of theory, simulations, and observations to study continuously-created negative masses. The paper suggests that "the compelling puzzle of the dark Universe may have been due to a simple sign error" and leads to a cyclic universe with a time-variable Hubble parameter, potentially providing compatibility with the current tension that is emerging in cosmological measurements. The paper states that it was motivated based upon a statement by Albert Einstein, who had written that the cosmological constant required that "empty space takes the role of gravitating negative masses which are distributed all over the interstellar space".

Farnes' theory has created much debate within the scientific community. Krzysztof Bolejko, physicist at the University of Tasmania in Australia, says "Farnes' maths is fine", and that his hunch is that: "Inside cosmic voids the signal will be clearer and so it will be easier to distinguish between processes caused by dark energy and those caused by a constantly created matter with negative mass". Alex Murphy, Professor of Nuclear & Particle Astrophysics at the University of Edinburgh, said the findings were interesting and elegant: "It’s one of many efforts trying to provide answers to deeply troubling issues with our understanding of the contents of the universe. It’s just possible that an idea like this might provide the breakthrough that’s needed". Geraint Lewis, Professor of Astrophysics at the University of Sydney, said: "On the face of it, it comes up with some of the features of our universe, but the question is now: Can it explain the other observations we have of the universe. There's a whole bunch of tests we have to do first before we can say this is equivalent to our current understanding, and then we need to find out what predictions this model makes that the current cosmological model would fail at. We've always got to be pushing the frontier of fundamental physics because every time we open up a new area – at first it seems esoteric and weird, but eventually it flows into our everyday lives".

However, others were more critical with Sabine Hossenfelder saying that: "negative masses have not revolutionized cosmology", "Farnes in his paper instead wants negative gravitational masses to mutually repel each other. But general relativity won’t let you do this", and "A creation term is basically a magic fix by which you can explain everything and anything". This was contested by Farnes who submitted a comment that "Your disagreement appears to be with the work of Bondi, who showed that these negative masses are compatible with GR." and that "A creation term is also not 'a magic fix by which you can explain everything and anything'. That is incredibly misleading. It provides very exact and specific well-defined physical properties." Wired magazine were also critical about the work, with their Business Editor stating that "his theory isn’t the issue. It’s how Oxford University and Farnes himself communicated it to the wider public." Later the same month, Wired published a second article stating: "Farnes is careful to point out that his ideas are speculative, and it is still unclear whether they are consistent with prior telescope observations and dark matter experiments". The Age then published an article about a "radical new model of the universe" and claimed "it’s good to remember that the ideas of Einstein and many others were controversial when first published".

Farnes claims that definitive proof of this theory will come from measurements of the distribution of galaxies throughout the history of the universe using the Square Kilometre Array telescope, which will come online in 2030.
