= Dark fluid =

Reconciliation between dark energy and dark matter

In astronomy and cosmology, the dark fluid theory attempts to explain dark matter and dark energy in a single framework, as suggested by cosmologist Alexandre Arbey in 2005. The theory proposes that dark matter and dark energy are not separate physical phenomena, nor do they have separate origins, but that they are strongly linked together and can be considered as two facets of a single fluid. At galactic scales, the dark fluid behaves like dark matter, and at larger scales its behavior becomes similar to dark energy.

In 2018 astrophysicist Jamie Farnes proposed that a dark fluid with negative mass would have the properties required to explain both dark matter and dark energy.

== Overview ==
Dark fluid is hypothesized to be a specific kind of fluid whose attractive and repulsive behaviors depend on the local energy density. In this theory, the dark fluid behaves like dark matter in the regions of space where the baryon density is high. The idea is that when the dark fluid is in the presence of matter, it slows down and coagulates around it; this then attracts more dark fluid to coagulate around it, thus amplifying the force of gravity near it. The effect is always present but only becomes noticeable in the presence of a very large mass such as a galaxy. This description is similar to theories of dark matter, and a special case of the equations of dark fluid reproduce dark matter.

On the other hand, in places where there is relatively little matter, as in the voids between galactic superclusters, this hypothesis predicts that the dark fluid relaxes and acquires a negative pressure. Thus dark fluid becomes a repulsive force, with an effect similar to that of dark energy.

Dark fluid goes beyond dark matter and dark energy in that it predicts a continuous range of attractive and repulsive qualities under various matter density cases. Indeed, special cases of various other gravitational theories are reproduced by dark fluid, e.g. inflation, quintessence, k-essence, f(R), Generalized Einstein-Aether f(K), MOND, TeVeS, BSTV, etc. Dark fluid theory also suggests new models, such as a certain f(K+R) model that suggests interesting corrections to MOND that depend on redshift and density.

== Simplifying assumptions ==
Dark fluid is not analyzed like a standard fluid mechanics model, because the complete equations in fluid mechanics are as of yet too difficult to solve. A formalized fluid mechanical approach, like the generalized Chaplygin gas model, would be an ideal method for modeling dark fluid, but it currently requires too many observational data points for the computations to be feasible, and not enough data points are available to cosmologists. A simplification step was undertaken by modeling the hypothesis through scalar field models instead, as is done in other alternative approaches to dark energy and dark matter.
