= Micaiah John Muller Hill =

English mathematician (1856–1929)

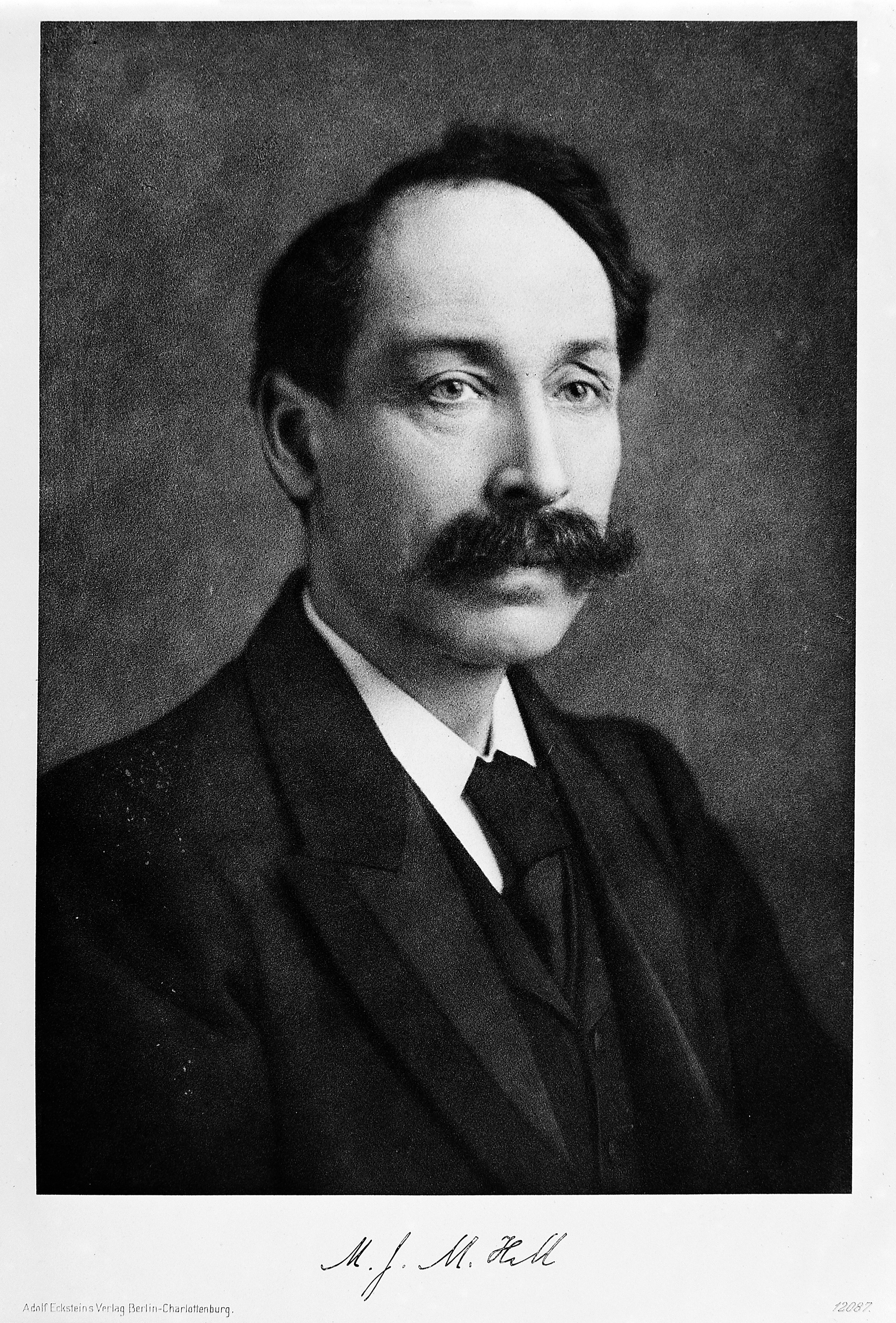
M. J. M. Hill (1906)

Micaiah John Muller Hill FRS (1856–1929) was an English mathematician, known for Hill's spherical vortex and Hill's tetrahedra.

He was born on 22 February 1856 in Berhampore, Bengal, India, the son of Revd. Samuel John Hill (1825–1881) and Leonora Josephina Muller (1833–1917).

Hill received a bachelor's degree in 1873 and an M.A. in 1876 from University College, London. In 1880–1884, he was a professor of mathematics at Mason College (which later became Birmingham University). In 1891, he earned his Sc.D. from Cambridge University. From 1884 to 1907, he was Professor of Pure Mathematics at University College, London and from 1907 to 1923 Astor Professor of Mathematics, University of London.

In 1894, Hill was elected Fellow of the Royal Society. In 1926 and 1927 he served as president of the Mathematical Association.

Hill was one of the people to whom C. L. T. Griffith sent, in 1912, some of Ramanujan's work.

He married Minnie Grace Tarbotton, daughter of Marriott Ogle Tarbotton at St Saviour's Church, Paddington on 21 December 1892. His two sons were Roderic Hill and Geoffrey T. R. Hill.

== See also ==
- List of Vice-Chancellors of the University of London

Academic offices
Preceded by Sir William Job Collins	Vice-Chancellor of the University of London; 1909–1911	Succeeded by Sir William Job Collins
