= Variational vector field =

Vector field

In the mathematical fields of the calculus of variations and differential geometry, the variational vector field is a certain type of vector field defined on the tangent bundle of a differentiable manifold which gives rise to variations along a vector field in the manifold itself.

Specifically, let X be a vector field on M. Then X generates a one-parameter group of local diffeomorphisms Fl_{X}^{t}, the flow along X. The differential of Fl_{X}^{t} gives, for each t, a mapping

$$d\mathrm{Fl}_X^t : TM \to TM$$

where TM denotes the tangent bundle of M. This is a one-parameter group of local diffeomorphisms of the tangent bundle. The variational vector field of X, denoted by T(X) is the tangent to the flow of d Fl_{X}^{t}.
