= EqWorld =

EqWorld ("The World of Mathematical Equations") is a free online mathematics reference site that lists information about mathematical equations.

The site is part of the Institute for Problems in Mechanics, which is part of the Russian Academy of Sciences.

EqWorld covers ordinary differential, partial differential, integral, functional, and other mathematical equations. It also outlines some methods for solving equations, and lists many resources for solving equations, and has an equation archive which users can add to.

== Organization ==
The Editor-in-Chief is the Russian mathematician A. D. Polyanin. The editorial board includes members form other countries, e.g., William E. Schiesser, Daniel I. Zwillinger, etc.

== Publications ==
Besides the websites, numerous books have been published by the authors. Examples:

- A. D. Polyanin and A. V. Manzhirov, Handbook of Integral Equations, Chapman & Hall/CRC Press MR1790925 1998. xxvi+787 pp. ISBN 0-8493-2876-4.

== See also ==
- Mathworld
