= Lamb–Chaplygin dipole =

Mathematical Model

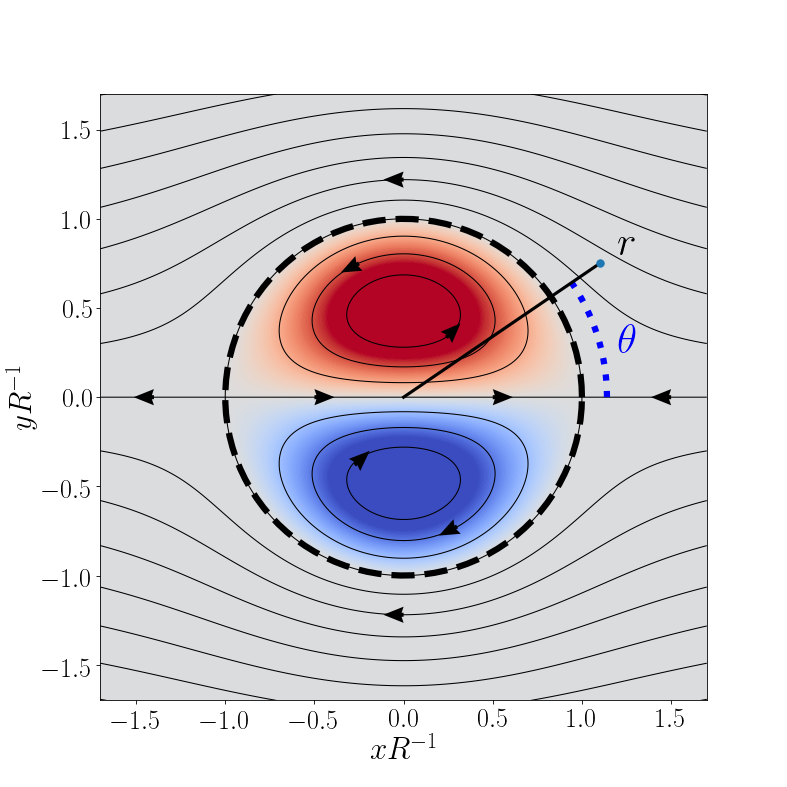
The flow structure of the Lamb-Chaplygin dipole

The Lamb–Chaplygin dipole model is a mathematical description for a particular inviscid and steady dipolar vortex flow. It is a non-trivial solution to the two-dimensional Euler equations. The model is named after Horace Lamb and Sergey Alexeyevich Chaplygin, who independently discovered this flow structure. This dipole is the two-dimensional analogue of Hill's spherical vortex.

== The model ==
A two-dimensional (2D), solenoidal vector field $\mathbf{u}$ may be described by a scalar stream function $\psi$, via $\mathbf{u} = -\mathbf{e_z} \times \mathbf{\nabla} \psi$, where $\mathbf{e_z}$ is the right-handed unit vector perpendicular to the 2D plane. By definition, the stream function is related to the vorticity $\omega$ via a Poisson equation: $-\nabla^2\psi = \omega$. The Lamb–Chaplygin model follows from demanding the following characteristics:

- The dipole has a circular atmosphere/separatrix with radius $R$: $\psi\left(r = R\right) = 0$.
- The dipole propages through an otherwise irrotational fluid ($\omega(r > R) = 0)$ at translation velocity $U$.
- The flow is steady in the co-moving frame of reference: $\omega (r < R) = f\left(\psi\right)$.
- Inside the atmosphere, there is a linear relation between the vorticity and the stream function $\omega = k^2 \psi$

The solution $\psi$ in cylindrical coordinates ($r, \theta$), in the co-moving frame of reference reads:

$$\begin{align}
\psi =
\begin{cases}
\frac{-2 U J_{1}(kr)}{kJ_{0}(kR)}\mathrm{sin}(\theta) , & \text{for } r < R, \\
U\left(\frac{R^2}{r}-r\right)\mathrm{sin}(\theta), & \text{for } r \geq R,
\end {cases}
\end{align}$$

where $J_0 \text{ and } J_1$ are the zeroth and first Bessel functions of the first kind, respectively. Further, the value of $k$ is such that $kR = 3.8317...$, the first non-trivial zero of the first Bessel function of the first kind.

== Usage and considerations ==
Since the seminal work of P. Orlandi, the Lamb–Chaplygin vortex model has been a popular choice for numerical studies on vortex-environment interactions. The fact that it does not deform make it a prime candidate for consistent flow initialization. A less favorable property is that the second derivative of the flow field at the dipole's edge is not continuous. Further, it serves a framework for stability analysis on dipolar-vortex structures.
