= Euler–Tricomi equation =

Linear partial differential equation

In mathematics, the Euler–Tricomi equation is a linear partial differential equation useful in the study of transonic flow. It is named after mathematicians Leonhard Euler and Francesco Giacomo Tricomi.

$$u_{xx}+xu_{yy}=0. \,$$

It is elliptic in the half plane x > 0, parabolic at x = 0 and hyperbolic in the half plane x < 0. Its characteristics are

$$x\,dx^2+dy^2=0, \,$$

which have the integral

$$y\pm\frac{2}{3}x^{3/2}=C,$$

where C is a constant of integration. The characteristics thus comprise two families of semicubical parabolas, with cusps on the line x = 0, the curves lying on the right hand side of the y-axis.

== Particular solutions ==
A general expression for particular solutions to the Euler–Tricomi equations is:

$$u_{k,p,q}=\sum_{i=0}^k(-1)^i\frac{x^{m_i}y^{n_i}}{c_i} \,$$

where

$$k \in \mathbb{N}$$
$$p, q \in \{0,1\}$$
$$m_i = 3i+p$$
$$n_i = 2(k-i)+q$$
$$c_i = m_i!!! \cdot (m_i-1)!!! \cdot n_i!! \cdot (n_i-1)!!$$

These can be linearly combined to form further solutions such as:

for k = 0:

$$u=A + Bx + Cy + Dxy \,$$

for k = 1:

$$u=A(\tfrac{1}{2}y^2 - \tfrac{1}{6}x^3) + B(\tfrac{1}{2}xy^2 - \tfrac{1}{12}x^4) + C(\tfrac{1}{6}y^3 - \tfrac{1}{6}x^3y) + D(\tfrac{1}{6}xy^3 - \tfrac{1}{12}x^4y) \,$$

etc.

The Euler–Tricomi equation is a limiting form of Chaplygin's equation.

== See also ==
- Burgers' equation
- Chaplygin's equation
- List of topics named after Leonhard Euler

== Bibliography ==
- A. D. Polyanin, Handbook of Linear Partial Differential Equations for Engineers and Scientists, Chapman & Hall/CRC Press, 2002.
