= Sergey Chaplygin =

Russian-Soviet engineer, mathematician and physicist

Sergey Alekseyevich Chaplygin
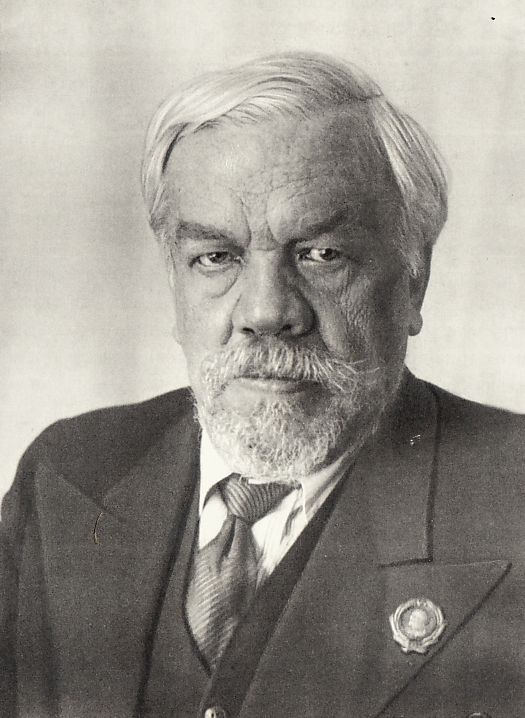
- Born: 5 April 1869; Ranenburg, Russian Empire
- Died: 8 October 1942 (aged 73); Novosibirsk, Soviet Union
- Education: Moscow University
- Known for: mechanics
- Awards: Hero of Socialist Labour (1941); Orders of Lenin (1933, 1941); Order of the Red Banner of Labour (1927,?); Zhukovsky Prize (1925)
- Scientific career
- Fields: Mechanical
- Workplaces: TsAGI, Moscow University, etc.
- Doctoral advisor: Nikolay Zhukovsky
- Doctoral students: Nikolai Kochin

Sergey Alexeyevich Chaplygin (Russian: Серге́й Алексе́евич Чаплы́гин; 5 April 1869 – 8 October 1942) was a Russian and Soviet physicist, mathematician, and mechanical engineer. He is known for mathematical formulas such as Chaplygin's equation and for a hypothetical substance in cosmology called Chaplygin gas, named after him.

He graduated in 1890 from Moscow University, and later became a professor. He taught mechanical engineering at Moscow Higher Courses for Women in 1901, and of applied mathematics at Moscow School of Technology, 1903. He was appointed Director of the courses in 1905. Leonid I. Sedov was one of his students.

Chaplygin's theories were greatly inspired by N. Ye. Zhukovsky, who founded the Central Institute of Aerodynamics. His early research focused on hydromechanics. His "Collected Works", consisting of 4 volumes, were published in 1948.

== Biography ==
=== Early life ===
Chaplygin was born to Aleksei Timofeevich Chaplygin, a shop assistant, and Anna Petrovna in Ranenburg (present day Chaplygin), Russia. After his father died when he was 2 years old, his mother remarried a tradesman and they moved to Voronezh. There, he attended the Voronezh Gymnasium, which he graduated in 1886.

Soon after, he attended the Moscow University, specializing in Physics and Mathematics, which he graduated from in 1890. There he met and was strongly influenced by Nikolai Egorovich Zhukovsky. In 1893, he published his first work, On certain cases of the motion of a solid body in a fluid, for which he received the N. D. Brashman Award.

After graduating from the university, he went on to become a professor there. In 1897, he published On the motion of a heavy body of revolution in a horizontal plane, which was the first to present the general equation of motion of a nonholonomic system. This equation is a generalisation of Lagrange's equation. In 1899, he was awarded the Gold Medal of the St. Petersburg Academy of Sciences.

=== Death ===
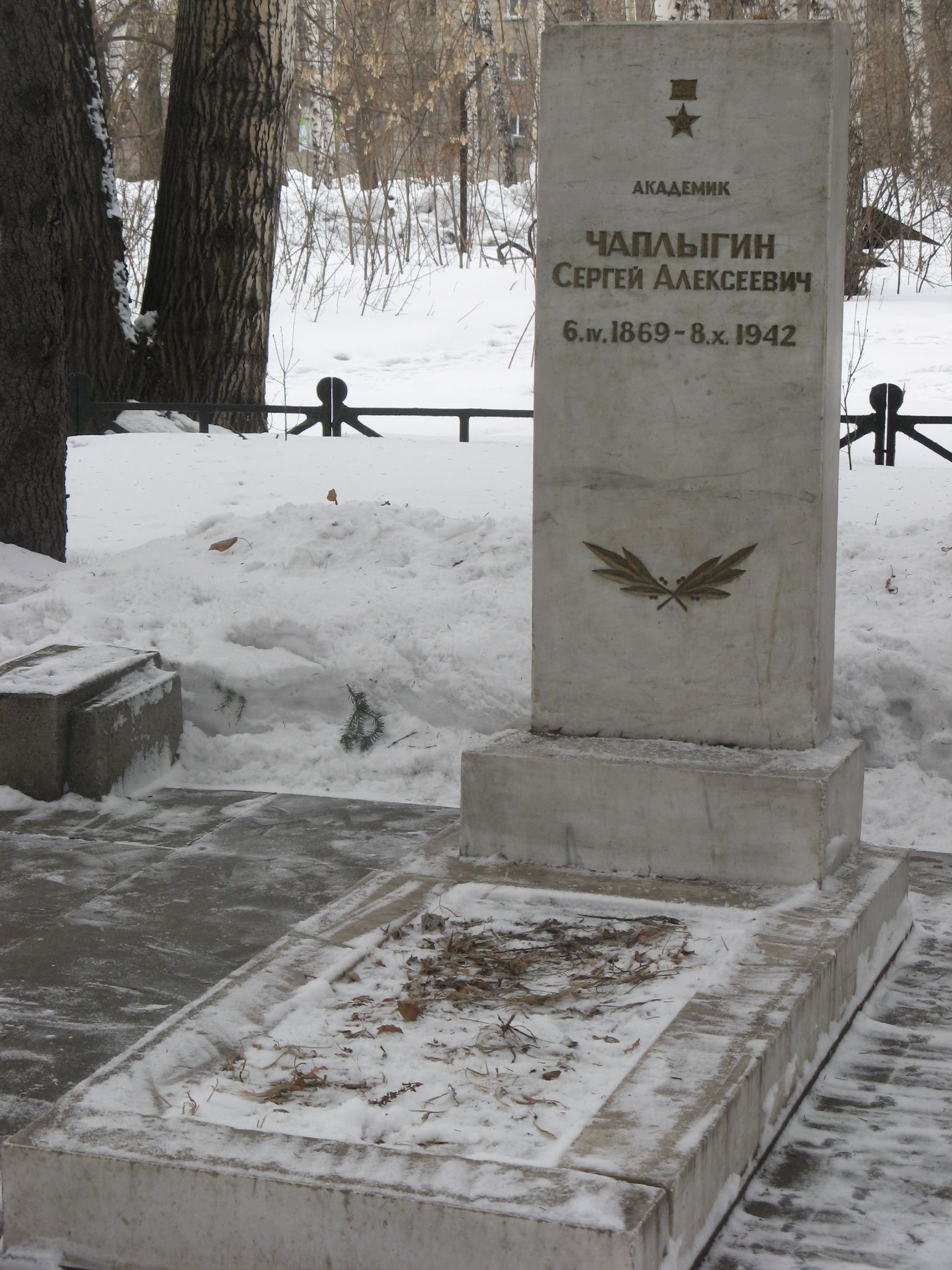
Grave of Sergey Chaplygin

Chaplygin died of a brain haemorrhage in October 1942.

== Honours and awards ==
- Hero of Socialist Labour (1 February 1941)
- Two Orders of Lenin (1 February 1941 and 22 December 1933)
- Order of the Red Banner of Labour, twice (10 July 1927 and ?)
- Zhukovsky Prize (1925)
- N. D. Brashman Prize (1897)

Chaplygin was elected to the Russian Academy of Sciences (the Academy of Sciences of the USSR in 1925-1991) in 1924.

The lunar crater Chaplygin and town Chaplygin are named in his honour.

== See also ==
- Chaplygin gas
- Chaplygin problem
- Chaplygin's equation
- Chaplygin's theorem
- Lamb–Chaplygin dipole
- Chaplygin sleigh
- Chaplygin's top
