= Strauch =

Strauch, a German word meaning bush or shrub, is a surname. Notable people with it include:

- Adolfo Strauch, (b. 1948), survivor of the Uruguayan Air Force Flight 571 crash
- Adolph Strauch (1822–1883), landscape architect
- Aegidius Strauch II (1632–1682), German mathematician and theologian
- Alexander Strauch (1832–1893), Russian naturalist
- Eduard Strauch (1906–1955), German Nazi SS-Obersturmbannführer and Holocaust perpetrator
- Eduardo Strauch,(b. 1947), survivor of the Uruguayan Air Force Flight 571 crash
- James Strauch (1921–1998), American Olympic fencer
- Marten Strauch (born 1986), German international rugby union player
- Philipp Strauch (1862–1924), Russian sailor of German origin, who competed in the 1912 Summer Olympics
- Pierre Strauch (born 1958), French cellist, composer and conductor

== See also ==
- Strauch Field, a private Airport located 2 miles south of Junction City in Lane County, Oregon, USA
- Strauch's pitviper (Gloydius strauchi), a venomous pitviper species found in western China
- Strauch's spotted newt (Neurergus strauchii), a salamander species found only in Turkey
