= Chaplygin gas =

Hypothetical substance used in certain cosmological theories

Chaplygin gas, which occurs in certain theories of cosmology, is a hypothetical substance that satisfies an exotic equation of state in the form $p = -A/\rho^\alpha$, where $p$ is the pressure, $\rho$ is the density, with $\alpha = 1$ and $A$ a positive constant. The substance is named after Sergey Chaplygin.

In some models, generalized Chaplygin gas is considered, where $\alpha$ is a parameter, which can take on values $0 < \alpha \le 1$.

A slowly rotating spherically symmetric, non-viscous, self-gravitating Chapligin gas solves the Hubble tension.

== See also ==
- Dark fluid
