= Chaplygin's equation =

Partial differential equation

In gas dynamics, Chaplygin's equation, named after Sergei Alekseevich Chaplygin (1902), is a partial differential equation useful in the study of transonic flow. It is

$$\frac{\partial^2 \Phi}{\partial \theta^2} +
\frac{v^2}{1-v^2/c^2}\frac{\partial^2 \Phi}{\partial v^2}+v \frac{\partial \Phi}{\partial v}=0.$$

Here, $c=c(v)$ is the speed of sound, determined by the equation of state of the fluid and conservation of energy. For polytropic gases, we have $c^2/(\gamma-1) = h_0- v^2/2$, where $\gamma$ is the specific heat ratio and $h_0$ is the stagnation enthalpy, in which case the Chaplygin's equation reduces to

$$\frac{\partial^2 \Phi}{\partial \theta^2} +
v^2\frac{2h_0-v^2}{2h_0-(\gamma+1)v^2/(\gamma-1)}\frac{\partial^2 \Phi}{\partial v^2}+v \frac{\partial \Phi}{\partial v}=0.$$

The Bernoulli equation (see the derivation below) states that maximum velocity occurs when specific enthalpy is at the smallest value possible; one can take the specific enthalpy to be zero corresponding to absolute zero temperature as the reference value, in which case $2h_0$ is the maximum attainable velocity. The particular integrals of above equation can be expressed in terms of hypergeometric functions.

== Derivation ==
For two-dimensional potential flow, the continuity equation and the Euler equations (in fact, the compressible Bernoulli's equation due to irrotationality) in Cartesian coordinates $(x,y)$ involving the variables fluid velocity $(v_x,v_y)$, specific enthalpy $h$ and density $\rho$ are

$$\begin{align}
\frac{\partial }{\partial x}(\rho v_x) + \frac{\partial }{\partial y}(\rho v_y) &=0,\\
h + \frac{1}{2}v^2 &= h_o.
\end{align}$$

with the equation of state $\rho=\rho(s,h)$ acting as third equation. Here $h_o$ is the stagnation enthalpy, $v^2 = v_x^2 + v_y^2$ is the magnitude of the velocity vector and $s$ is the entropy. For isentropic flow, density can be expressed as a function only of enthalpy $\rho=\rho(h)$, which in turn using Bernoulli's equation can be written as $\rho=\rho(v)$.

Since the flow is irrotational, a velocity potential $\phi$ exists and its differential is simply $d\phi = v_x dx + v_y dy$. Instead of treating $v_x=v_x(x,y)$ and $v_y=v_y(x,y)$ as dependent variables, we use a coordinate transform such that $x=x(v_x,v_y)$ and $y=y(v_x,v_y)$ become new dependent variables. Similarly the velocity potential is replaced by a new function (Legendre transformation)

$$\Phi = xv_x + yv_y - \phi$$

such then its differential is $d\Phi = xdv_x + y dv_y$, therefore

$$x = \frac{\partial \Phi}{\partial v_x}, \quad y = \frac{\partial \Phi}{\partial v_y}.$$

Introducing another coordinate transformation for the independent variables from $(v_x,v_y)$ to $(v,\theta)$ according to the relation $v_x = v\cos\theta$ and $v_y = v\sin\theta$, where $v$ is the magnitude of the velocity vector and $\theta$ is the angle that the velocity vector makes with the $v_x$-axis, the dependent variables become

$$\begin{align}
x &= \cos\theta \frac{\partial \Phi}{\partial v}-\frac{\sin\theta}{v}\frac{\partial \Phi}{\partial \theta},\\
y &= \sin\theta \frac{\partial \Phi}{\partial v}+\frac{\cos\theta}{v}\frac{\partial \Phi}{\partial \theta},\\
\phi & = -\Phi + v\frac{\partial \Phi}{\partial v}.
\end{align}$$

The continuity equation in the new coordinates become

$$\frac{d(\rho v)}{dv} \left(\frac{\partial \Phi}{\partial v} + \frac{1}{v} \frac{\partial^2 \Phi}{\partial \theta^2}\right) + \rho v \frac{\partial^2 \Phi}{\partial v^2} =0.$$

For isentropic flow, $dh=\rho^{-1}c^2 d\rho$, where $c$ is the speed of sound. Using the Bernoulli's equation we find

$$\frac{d(\rho v)}{d v} = \rho \left(1-\frac{v^2}{c^2}\right)$$

where $c=c(v)$. Hence, we have

$$\frac{\partial^2 \Phi}{\partial \theta^2} +
\frac{v^2}{1-\frac{v^2}{c^2}}\frac{\partial^2 \Phi}{\partial v^2}+v \frac{\partial \Phi}{\partial v}=0.$$

== See also ==
- Euler–Tricomi equation
