= Chaplygin sleigh =

The Chaplygin sleigh is a simple pedagogical example of a nonholonomic system in mechanics, described by Sergey Chaplygin. It consists of a body that slides frictionlessly on a horizontal plane, with a knife edge that constrains its motion so that the knife slides only longitudinally. Because this constraint is nonholonomic, Liouville's theorem does not apply, and although energy is conserved, the motion is dissipative in the sense that phase-space volume is not conserved. The motion is attracted to an equilibrium, in which the sleigh moves without rotation, with the knife edge trailing the center of mass.

There are several ways of seeing that the system is nonholonomic. The dimension of the phase space is 5, which is odd. The constraint on the velocity is not derivable from a constraint on the coordinates.

The motion of the system can be characterized simply. Let v be the velocity, with positive values indicating that the knife edge trails. Let ω be the angular velocity. Then the equations of motion are

$$\dot{v} = a\omega^2,$$

$$\dot{\omega} = -\frac{ma}{I+ma^2} v \omega,$$

where a is the distance between the center of mass and contact point which is frequently the front of the sleigh, I is the moment of inertia, and m is the mass. The solutions are ellipses in the v–ω plane. The equations of motion are symmetric under time reversal, but asymmetric under inversion of the body-fixed axis aligned with the knife edge.

In geometric mechanics, the Chaplygin sleigh lives in the special Euclidean group $\text{SE}_2(\mathbb{R}) \cong \text{SO}(2) \rtimes \mathbb{R}^2$ since the position and direction are accounted for.

The analogue of the Chaplygin sleigh is the torpedo. Now, the body glides frictionlessly through space rather than the plane. The system is constrained to slide only longitudinally and cannot twist around the direction of motion similar to how a torpedo moves through water. The dimension of the phase space is 9 since there are 6 positions and 6 velocities coupled with 3 constraints. This system is the natural analogue to the Chaplygin sleigh since it lives in $\text{SE}_3(\mathbb{R}) \cong \text{SO}(3) \rtimes \mathbb{R}^3$.
