= Chaplyginsky District =

Chaplyginsky District Чаплыгинский район (Russian)
- District
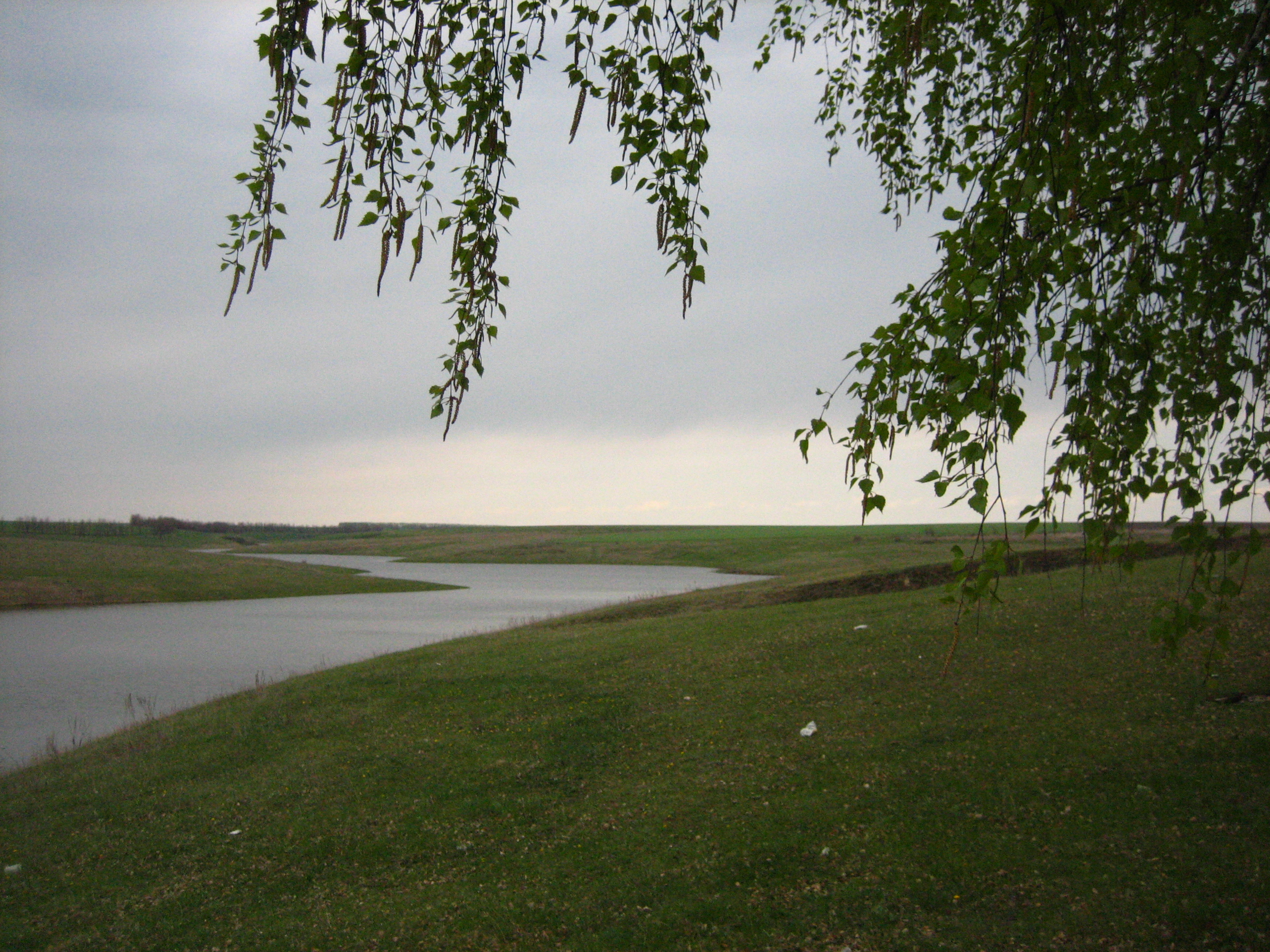
- Landscape in Chaplyginsky District

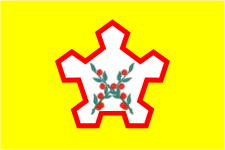
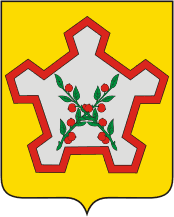
- Flag Coat of arms
- Location of Chaplyginsky District in Lipetsk Oblast
- Coordinates: 53°15′N 39°58′E
- Country: Russia
- Federal subject: Lipetsk Oblast
- Administrative center: Chaplygin

Area
  - Total: 1,520 km^{2} (590 sq mi)

Population (2010 Census)
  - Total: 32,704
  - Density: 21.5/km^{2} (55.7/sq mi)
  - Urban: 38.7%
  - Rural: 61.3%

Administrative structure
  - Administrative divisions: 1 towns of district significance, 22 Selsoviets
  - Inhabited localities: 1 cities/towns, 102 rural localities

Municipal structure
  - Municipally incorporated as: Chaplyginsky Municipal District
  - Municipal divisions: 1 urban settlements, 22 rural settlements
- Time zone: UTC+3 (MSK)
- OKTMO ID: 42656000
- Website: http://chaplygin-r.ru/

Chaplyginsky District (Russian: Чаплы́гинский райо́н) is an administrative and municipal district (raion), one of the eighteen in Lipetsk Oblast, Russia. It is located in the northeast of the oblast. The area of the district is 1,520 square kilometers (590 sq mi). Its administrative center is the town of Chaplygin. Population: 30,536 (2021 census); 32,704 (2010 census); 36,069 (2002 Census); 39,832 (1989 Soviet census). The population of Chaplygin accounts for 37.9% of the district's total population.
