= Chaplygin problem =

Mathematical problem related to isoperimetry

In mathematics, particularly in the fields of nonlinear dynamics and the calculus of variations, the Chaplygin problem is an isoperimetric problem with a differential constraint. Specifically, the problem is to determine what flight path an airplane in a constant wind field should take in order to encircle the maximum possible area in a given amount of time. The airplane is assumed to be constrained to move in a plane, moving at a constant airspeed v, for time T, and the wind is assumed to move in a constant direction with speed w.

The solution of the problem is that the airplane should travel in an ellipse whose major axis is perpendicular to w, with eccentricity w/v.

== See also ==
- Isoperimetric inequality : zero wind speed case
