= Chaplygin, Lipetsk Oblast =

Town in Lipetsk Oblast, Russia

Chaplygin Чаплыгин
- Town
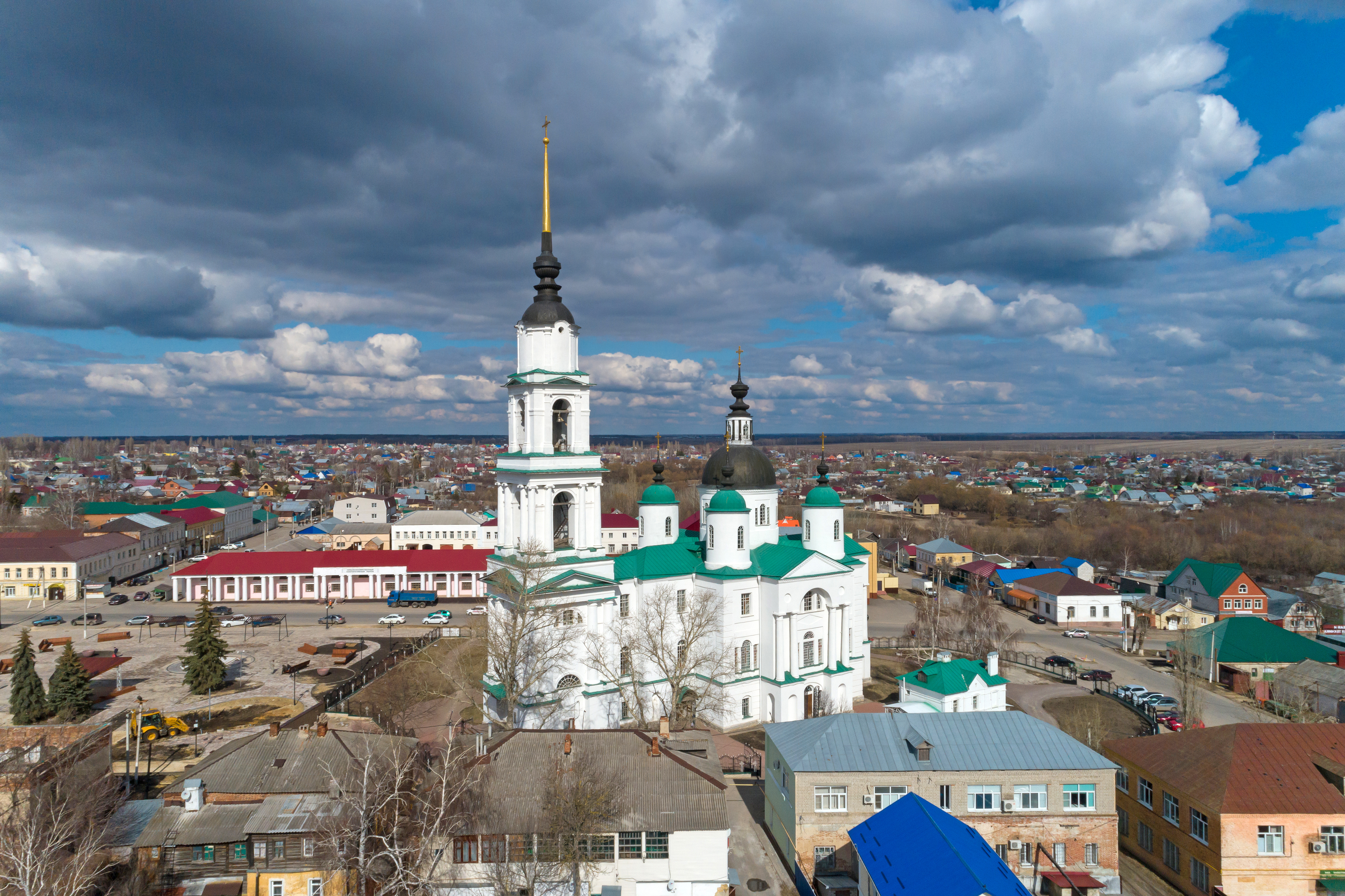
- Holy Trinity Church

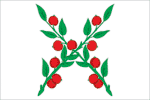
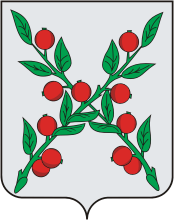
- Flag Coat of arms
- Interactive map of Chaplygin
- Location of Chaplygin Chaplygin (Lipetsk Oblast)
- Coordinates: 53°14′N 39°58′E
- Country: Russia
- Federal subject: Lipetsk Oblast
- Administrative district: Chaplyginsky District
- Town under district jurisdictionSelsoviet: Chaplygin
- Founded: First half of the 17th century
- Town status since: 1778
- Elevation: 140 m (460 ft)

Population (2010 Census)
  - Total: 12,656
  - Estimate (2021): 11,579 (−8.5%)

Administrative status
  - Capital of: Chaplyginsky District, Chaplygin Town Under District Jurisdiction

Municipal status
  - Municipal district: Chaplyginsky Municipal District
  - Urban settlement: Chaplygin Urban Settlement
  - Capital of: Chaplyginsky Municipal District, Chaplygin Urban Settlement
- Time zone: UTC+3 (MSK)
- Postal codes: 399900, 399902, 399903, 399959
- OKTMO ID: 42656101001

Chaplygin (Russian: Чаплы́гин) is a town and the administrative center of Chaplyginsky District in Lipetsk Oblast, Russia, located at the confluence of the Stanovaya Ryasa and Yagodnaya Ryasa Rivers, 85 kilometers (53 mi) north of Lipetsk, the administrative center of the oblast. Population: 11,579 (2021 census); 12,656 (2010 census); 13,656 (2002 census); 14,343 (1989 Soviet census).

== History ==
The settlement of Ust Stanovykh Ryas (Усть Становы́х Ряс) was founded on the territory of modern Chaplygin in the first half of the 17th century. It later grew into the village (selo) of Slobodskoye (Слободско́е). In 1695, Peter the Great built a small wooden palace in the vicinity, and in 1702 a small fortress under the name of Oranienburg (Ораниенбу́рг). The name, originally taken from that of the German town Oranienburg, was modified to Raninburg and later to Ranenburg (Раненбу́рг). Also in 1702, both the fortress and the village of Slobodskoye were granted to Alexander Menshikov, who built a small monastery here in 1712.

Town status was granted to Ranenburg in 1778. In 1948, it was renamed Chaplygin after the Russian physicist Sergey Chaplygin, who was born here in 1869.

== Administrative and municipal status ==
Within the framework of administrative divisions, Chaplygin serves as the administrative center of Chaplyginsky District. As an administrative division, it is incorporated within Chaplyginsky District as Chaplygin Town Under District Jurisdiction. As a municipal division, Chaplygin Town Under District Jurisdiction is incorporated within Chaplyginsky Municipal District as Chaplygin Urban Settlement.

== Economy ==
Food industry is the main sector of economy.
