= Brief Answers to the Big Questions =

2018 popular science book by Stephen Hawking

- First edition cover (Hardcover)
- Author: Stephen Hawking
- Publisher: John Murray (Hardcover); Bantam Books (Paperback)
- Publication date: 16 October 2018
- Publication place: United States
- Media type: Print (hardcover)
- Pages: 256
- ISBN: 9781529345421
- Preceded by: The Dreams That Stuff Is Made Of

Brief Answers to the Big Questions is a popular science book written by physicist Stephen Hawking, and published by Hodder & Stoughton (hardcover) and Bantam Books (paperback) on 16 October 2018. The book examines some of the universe's greatest mysteries, and promotes the view that science is very important in helping to solve problems on planet Earth. The publisher describes the book as "a selection of [Hawking's] most profound, accessible, and timely reflections from his personal archive", and is based on, according to a book reviewer, "half a million or so words" from his essays, lectures and keynote speeches.

The book was incomplete at the time of the author's passing in March 2018, but was completed with "his academic colleagues, his family and the Stephen Hawking Estate". The book includes a foreword written by Eddie Redmayne, who won an Academy Award for his portrayal of Hawking in the 2014 film The Theory of Everything; an introduction by Nobel Prize-winning physicist Kip Thorne; and an afterword by Lucy Hawking, the author's daughter. A portion of the royalties from the book are to go to the Motor Neurone Disease Association and the Stephen Hawking Foundation.

== Contents ==
The book treats four main subjects: "Why Are We Here? Will We Survive? Will Technology Save Us or Destroy Us? How Can We Thrive?". It devotes a chapter to each of the following questions: Is there a God? How did it all begin? What is inside a black hole? Can we predict the future? Is time travel possible? Will we survive on Earth? Is there other intelligent life in the universe? Should we colonise space? Will artificial intelligence outsmart us? How do we shape the future?

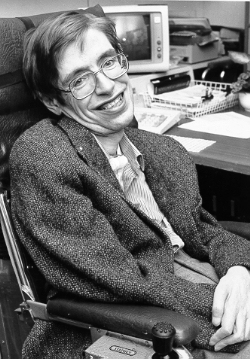
Stephen Hawking at NASA's StarChild Learning Center, 1980s

The book discusses many of today's challenges, including the biggest threat to the planet (an "asteroid collision", like the one that wiped out the dinosaurs 66 million years ago ... "we have no defense" against that), climate change ("a rise in ocean temperature would melt the ice caps and cause the release of large amounts of carbon dioxide ... [making] our climate like that of Venus with a temperature of 250 °C (482 °F)"), the threat of nuclear war ("at some point in the next 1,000 years, nuclear war or environmental calamity will 'cripple Earth'"), nuclear power ("that would give us clean energy with no pollution or global warming"), the development of artificial intelligence (AI) ("in the future AI could develop a will of its own, a will that is in conflict with ours") and humans ("a genetically-modified race of superhumans, say with greater memory and disease resistance, would imperil the others").

The book also discusses the "big questions", including life ("in the next 50 years, we will come to understand how life began and possibly discover whether life exists elsewhere in the universe"), time ("You can't get to a time before the Big Bang [because] there was no time before the Big Bang ... If the concept of time only exists within our universe and the universe came to be spontaneously ... and with it, brought time into existence, there's simply no 'before' to consider." Hawking used the simile, that there is nothing on Earth south of the South Pole. After discussing the inhomogeneities in the cosmic background radiation, detailed by the WMAP satellite, the book concludes "So look carefully at the map of the microwave sky. It is the blueprint for all the structure in the universe. We are the product of quantum fluctuations in the early universe. God really does play dice."

Further, Hawking believed the universe could reach an end point, either through an eventual cosmic "crunch or an expansion" and "in the interim ... we are all time travelers, journeying together into the future. But let us make that future a place we want to visit", the possibility of time travel ("asking if time travel is possible is a 'very serious question' that our current understanding cannot rule out"), and God ("knowing the mind of God is knowing the laws of nature ... My prediction is that we will know the mind of God by the end of this century"; further, "if you like, you can call the laws of science 'God,' but it wouldn't be a personal God that you would meet and put questions to ... [nevertheless] the simplest explanation is that God does not exist and there is no reliable evidence for an afterlife, though people could live on through their influence and genes"). As for the need for a God to cause the Big Bang, Hawking stated that "The laws of nature itself tell us that not only could the universe have popped into existence without any assistance, like a proton, and have required nothing in terms of energy, but also it is possible that nothing caused the Big Bang. Nothing."

According to Hawking in the book, education and science are "in danger now more than ever before", and urged young people "to look up at the stars and not down at your feet ... Try to make sense of what you see, and wonder about what makes the universe exist ... It matters that you don't give up. Unleash your imagination. Shape the future."

== Reviews ==
First edition cover (Paperback)

Physicist Marcelo Gleiser, reviewing the book for NPR, writes: "Stephen Hawking is one of those rare luminaries whose life symbolizes the best humanity has to offer ... [his book is one] every thinking person worried about humanity's future should read ... If there is a unifying theme across the book, it is Hawking's deep faith in science's ability to solve humanity's biggest problems ... His answers to the big questions illustrate his belief in the rationality of nature and on our ability to uncover all its secrets. His optimism permeates every page ... Although Hawking touches on the origin of the universe, the physics of black holes and some of his other favorite topics, his main concern in this book is not physics. It's humanity and its collective future ... Focusing his attention in the book on three related questions – the future of our planet, colonization of other planets, and the rise of artificial intelligence – he charts his strategy to save us from ourselves ... Only science, Hawking argues, can save us from our mistakes ... Hawking believes that humanity's evolutionary mission is to spread through the galaxy as a sort of cosmic gardener, sowing life along the way. He believes ... that we will develop a positive relation with intelligent machines and that, together, we will redesign the current fate of the world and of our species."

According to award-winning science editor Tim Radford, writing for The Guardian, Hawking's book is "effortlessly instructive, absorbing, up to the minute and – where it matters – witty." Radford quotes Hawking, "If the universe adds up to nothing, then you don't need a God to create it. The universe is the ultimate free lunch"; "our worst mistake ever" [if we are dismissive about artificial intelligence]; "Our future is a race between the growing power of our technology and the wisdom with which we use it. Let's make sure that wisdom wins." and "If humanity is to continue for another million years, our future lies in going boldly [with more manned space exploration] where no one else has gone before." Radford writes, "People who argue for good education for all, a decently funded NHS (National Health Service) and serious investment in research will rediscover him as a friend."

Reviewer Abigail Higgins, writing for Vox, notes that author Hawking, in the book, is "funny and optimistic, even as he warns us that artificial intelligence is likely to outsmart us, that the wealthy are bound to develop into a superhuman species, and that the planet is hurtling toward total inhabitability ... [the] book is ultimately a verdict on humanity's future. At first blush, the verdict is that we're doomed. But dig deeper and there's something else here too, a faith that human wisdom and innovation will thwart our own destruction, even when we seem hellbent on bringing it about." According to a book review by science journalist Matin Durraniin, current editor of Physics World: "Hawking ticks off all the big ideas you'd expect from one of his books. General relativity. The Big Bang. Inflation. Galaxy formation. Gravitational waves ... This book will stand as Hawking's manifesto. Optimistic, upbeat and visionary, it sees science – and scientific understanding – as vital for the future of humanity."

== Criticism ==
According to John Horgan, science journalist writing for The Wall Street Journal, Hawking, in his book, prefers string theory as a way of explaining the "theory of everything" (which Hawking predicts to be solved by "the end of this century") and, based on quantum mechanics, considers empty space as filled with virtual particles, "popping into and out of existence", suggesting our entire universe began as one of those particles, and additionally, that our cosmos is "just a minuscule bubble in an infinite ocean, or 'multiverse'". In this regard, Horgan refers to the concern of German physicist Sabine Hossenfelder, in her 2018 book Lost in Math: How Beauty Leads Physics Astray, that "physicists working on strings and multiverses are not really practising physics," and quotes Hossenfelder, "I'm not sure anymore that what we do here, in the foundations of physics, is science". Nevertheless, Ephrat Livni writing for Quartz cites Hawking's belief that laws of nature alone suffice to explain the creation of our universe in the Big Bang, without any need for a creation act by God.

Jon Christian, writing for Futurism and published in Science Alert, notes that Hawking, in his book, makes several predictions, including predictions about gene editing, artificial intelligence and religion, with which some experts may not fully agree. Reviewer Zayan Guedim, commenting on EdgyLabs, writes, "The book is not a culmination of all of the great scientist's works, and it doesn't provide any particularly new discoveries. However, it does show us the importance of our future, the 'Big Questions' and the growing necessity of looking after our planet."

== See also ==
- A Brief History of Time – 1988 book by Stephen Hawking
- A Briefer History of Time – 2005 popular science book by Stephen Hawking
- Brave New World – 1932 dystopian novel by Aldous Huxley
- Brave New World Revisited – 1958 non-fiction book by Aldous Huxley
- Popularizers of science, listing of notables – Interpretation of science intended for a general audience
- Science tourism – Travel to notable science locations
- The Grand Design – 2010 popular science book by Stephen Hawking
- The Joy of Science – Popular video lectures by Robert Hazen
