= Wu Zhongchao =

Chinese physicist (born 1946)

- 吳忠超
- Born: 1946 (age 79–80); Fuzhou, Fujian, Republic of China
- Education: University of Science and Technology of China; University of Cambridge
- Scientific career
- Fields: Theoretical physics
- Thesis: Cosmological models and the inflationary universe
- Doctoral advisor: Stephen Hawking

Wu Zhongchao (Chinese: 吳忠超; pinyin: Wú Zhōngchāo, [ǔ ʈʂʊ́ŋ ʈʂʰáʊ], born 1946) is a Chinese theoretical physicist and professor at Zhejiang University of Technology.

== Career ==
In 1963, Wu Zhongchao enrolled in the University of Science and Technology of China. In 1968, as part of a Cultural Revolution program, he was sent to work in a factory for five years. In 1971, he returned to the university as a teacher. In 1979, recommended by physicist Qian Linzhao, he went to Cambridge University in the United Kingdom to study theoretical physics with theoretical physicist Stephen Hawking. He mainly studied the very early universe. He received a doctorate from Cambridge University in 1984, and his doctoral thesis was titled "Cosmological models and the inflationary universe".

Wu's dissertation on the dimensionality of space and time won the third prize in the 1985 Gravity Research Foundation dissertation competition.

In 2002, Wu established the Institute of Astrophysics at Zhejiang University of Technology.

Wu has translated Hawking's books into Chinese. In 2001, he translated A Brief History of Time and in 2011 he released a Chinese translation of The Grand Design. When Hawking visited China in 1985, 2002 and 2006 Wu served as his interpreter.
