= On the Shoulders of Giants (book) =

Book by Stephen Hawking

- Cover
- Editor: Stephen Hawking
- Language: English
- Publisher: Running Press
- Publication date: 2002
- Publication place: United States
- Media type: Book
- Pages: 1280
- ISBN: 9780762416981
- OCLC: 50632825
- Preceded by: The Universe in a Nutshell
- Followed by: A Briefer History of Time

On the Shoulders of Giants: The Great Works of Physics and Astronomy is a compilation of scientific texts edited and with commentary by the British theoretical physicist Stephen Hawking. The book was published by Running Press in 2002.

== Content ==
The book includes selections from the following works in English:

- On the Revolutions of the Heavenly Spheres by Nicolaus Copernicus, which explains Copernicus' theory of heliocentrism: that the Sun, rather than Earth, lies in the center of the universe
- Two New Sciences by Galileo Galilei explains Galileo's discoveries in physics
- Mystery of the Cosmos, Harmony of the World and Rudolphine Tables by Johannes Kepler, which describes Kepler's theories and observations in astronomy
- Philosophiæ Naturalis Principia Mathematica (Mathematical Principles of Natural Philosophy) by Sir Isaac Newton
- The Principle of Relativity by Albert Einstein

The book also includes five critical essays by Hawking and Hawking's biographies of the five scientists whose works are included.
