= The Grand Design (book) =

2010 popular science book by Stephen Hawking

- First edition cover
- Authors: Stephen Hawking and Leonard Mlodinow
- Language: English
- Publisher: Bantam Books
- Publication date: September 7, 2010
- Publication place: United States
- Media type: Print (Hardcover)
- Pages: 208
- ISBN: 978-0-553-80537-6
- Preceded by: God Created the Integers
- Followed by: The Dreams That Stuff Is Made Of

The Grand Design is a popular-science book written by physicists Stephen Hawking and Leonard Mlodinow and published by Bantam Books in 2010. The book examines the history of scientific knowledge about the universe and explains eleven-dimensional M-theory. The authors of the book point out that a Unified Field Theory (a theory, based on an early model of the universe, proposed by Albert Einstein and other physicists) may not exist.

It argues that invoking God is not necessary to explain the origins of the universe, and that the Big Bang is a consequence of the laws of physics alone. In response to criticism, Hawking said: "One can't prove that God doesn't exist, but science makes God unnecessary." When pressed on his own religious views by the 2010 Channel 4 documentary Genius of Britain, he clarified that he did not believe in a personal God.

Published in the United States on September 7, 2010, the book became the number one bestseller on Amazon.com just a few days after publication. It was published in the United Kingdom on September 9, 2010, and became the number two bestseller on Amazon.co.uk on the same day. It topped the list of adult non-fiction books of The New York Times Non-fiction Best Seller list in September–October 2010.

== Synopsis ==
The book examines the history of scientific knowledge about the universe. It starts with the Ionian Greeks, who claimed that nature works by laws, and not by the will of the gods. It later presents the work of Nicolaus Copernicus, who advocated the concept that the Earth is not located in the center of the universe.

The book attempts to explain topics in a easier-to-understand way. Many examples related from daily life, mythology and history have been taken to explain, such as Viking Mythology about Skoll and Hati, movies like The Matrix, and the geocentric model of the universe.

The authors then describe the theory of quantum mechanics using, as an example, the probable movement of an electron around a room. The presentation has been described as easy to understand by some reviewers, but also as sometimes "impenetrable," by others.

The central claim of the book is that the theory of quantum mechanics and the theory of relativity together help us understand how universes could have formed out of nothing.

The authors write:

Because there is a law such as gravity, the universe can and will create itself from nothing. Spontaneous creation is the reason there is something rather than nothing, why the universe exists, why we exist. It is not necessary to invoke God to light the blue touch paper and set the universe going.

— Stephen Hawking and Leonard Mlodinow, The Grand Design, 2010

The authors explain, in a manner consistent with M-theory, that as the Earth is only one of several planets in the Solar System, and as the Milky Way galaxy is only one of many galaxies, the same may apply to our universe itself: that is, the universe may be one of a huge number of universes.

The book concludes with the statement that only some universes of the multiple universes (or multiverse) support life forms and that we are located in one of those universes. The laws of nature that are required for life forms to exist appear in some universes by pure chance, Hawking and Mlodinow explain (see Anthropic principle).

== Reactions ==
=== Positive reactions ===
Evolutionary biologist and advocate for atheism Richard Dawkins welcomed Hawking's position and said that "Darwinism kicked God out of biology but physics remained more uncertain. Hawking is now administering the coup de grace."

Theoretical physicist Sean M. Carroll, writing in The Wall Street Journal, described the book as speculative but ambitious: "The important lesson of The Grand Design is not so much the particular theory being advocated but the sense that science may be able to answer the deep 'Why?' questions that are part of fundamental human curiosity."

Cosmologist Lawrence Krauss, in his article "Our Spontaneous Universe", wrote that "there are remarkable, testable arguments that provide firmer empirical evidence of the possibility that our universe arose from nothing. ... If our universe arose spontaneously from nothing at all, one might predict that its total energy should be zero. And when we measure the total energy of the universe, which could have been anything, the answer turns out to be the only one consistent with this possibility. Coincidence? Maybe. But data like this coming in from our revolutionary new tools promise to turn much of what is now metaphysics into physics. Whether God survives is anyone's guess."

James Trefil, a professor of physics at George Mason University, said in his Washington Post review: "I've waited a long time for this book. It gets into the deepest questions of modern cosmology without a single equation. The reader will be able to get through it without bogging down in a lot of technical detail and will, I hope, have his or her appetite whetted for books with a deeper technical content. And who knows? Maybe in the end the whole multiverse idea will actually turn out to be right!"

Canada Press journalist Carl Hartman said: "Cosmologists, the people who study the entire cosmos, will want to read British physicist and mathematician Stephen Hawking's new book. The Grand Design may sharpen appetites for answers to questions like 'Why is there something rather than nothing?' and 'Why do we exist?' – questions that have troubled thinking people at least as far back as the ancient Greeks."

Writing in the Los Angeles Times, Michael Moorcock praised the authors: "their arguments do indeed bring us closer to seeing our world, universe and multiverse in terms that a previous generation might easily have dismissed as supernatural. This succinct, easily digested book could perhaps do with fewer dry, academic groaners, but Hawking and Mlodinow pack in a wealth of ideas and leave us with a clearer understanding of modern physics in all its invigorating complexity."

German daily Süddeutsche Zeitung devoted the whole opening page of its culture section to The Grand Design. CERN physicist and novelist Ralf Bönt reviews the history of the theory of everything from the 18th century to M-theory, and takes Hawking's conclusion on God's existence as a very good joke which he obviously welcomes very much.

Best selling author Deepak Chopra in an interview with CNN said: "We have to congratulate Leonard and Stephen for finally, finally contributing to the climatic overthrow of the superstition of materialism. Because everything that we call matter comes from this domain which is invisible, which is beyond space and time. All religious experience is based on just three basic fundamental ideas...And nothing in the book invalidates any of these three ideas".

=== Critical reactions ===
John Lennox, Professor of Mathematics at Oxford University, declared "nonsense remains nonsense, even when talked by world-famous scientists." He points to several self-contradictory elements within the central claim of the text, as well as many logical errors made throughout the book which claims "philosophy is dead."

Roger Penrose in the FT doubts that adequate understandings can come from this approach, and points out that "unlike quantum mechanics, M-theory enjoys no observational support whatsoever". Joe Silk in Science suggests that "Some humbleness would be welcome here...A century or two hence...I expect that M-theory will seem as naïve to cosmologists of the future as we now find Pythagoras's cosmology of the harmony of the spheres".

Gerald Schroeder in "The Big Bang Creation: God or the Laws of Nature" explains that "The Grand Design breaks the news, bitter to some, that … to create a universe from absolute nothing God is not necessary. All that is needed are the laws of nature. … [That is,] there can have been a big bang creation without the help of God, provided the laws of nature pre-date the universe. Our concept of time begins with the creation of the universe. Therefore if the laws of nature created the universe, these laws must have existed prior to time; that is the laws of nature would be outside of time. What we have then is totally non-physical laws, outside of time, creating a universe. Now that description might sound somewhat familiar. Very much like the biblical concept of God: not physical, outside of time, able to create a universe."

Dwight Garner in The New York Times was critical of the book, saying: "The real news about The Grand Design is how disappointingly tinny and inelegant it is. The spare and earnest voice that Mr. Hawking employed with such appeal in A Brief History of Time has been replaced here by one that is alternately condescending, as if he were Mr. Rogers explaining rain clouds to toddlers, and impenetrable."

Craig Callender, in the New Scientist, was not convinced by the theory promoted in the book: "M-theory ... is far from complete. But that doesn't stop the authors from asserting that it explains the mysteries of existence ... In the absence of theory, though, this is nothing more than a hunch doomed – until we start watching universes come into being – to remain untested. The lesson isn't that we face a dilemma between God and the multiverse, but that we shouldn't go off the rails at the first sign of coincidences."

Paul Davies in The Guardian wrote: "The multiverse comes with a lot of baggage, such as an overarching space and time to host all those bangs, a universe-generating mechanism to trigger them, physical fields to populate the universes with material stuff, and a selection of forces to make things happen. Cosmologists embrace these features by envisaging sweeping "meta-laws" that pervade the multiverse and spawn specific bylaws on a universe-by-universe basis. The meta-laws themselves remain unexplained – eternal, immutable transcendent entities that just happen to exist and must simply be accepted as given. In that respect the meta-laws have a similar status to an unexplained transcendent god." Davies concludes "there is no compelling need for a supernatural being or prime mover to start the universe off. But when it comes to the laws that explain the big bang, we are in murkier waters."

Dr. Marcelo Gleiser, in his article "Hawking And God: An Intimate Relationship", stated that "contemplating a final theory is inconsistent with the very essence of physics, an empirical science based on the gradual collection of data. Because we don’t have instruments capable of measuring all of Nature, we cannot ever be certain that we have a final theory. There’ll always be room for surprises, as the history of physics has shown again and again. In fact, I find it quite pretentious to imagine that we humans can achieve such a thing. ... Maybe Hawking should leave God alone."

Physicist Peter Woit, of Columbia University, has criticized the book: "One thing that is sure to generate sales for a book of this kind is to somehow drag in religion. The book's rather conventional claim that "God is unnecessary" for explaining physics and early universe cosmology has provided a lot of publicity for the book. I'm in favor of naturalism and leaving God out of physics as much as the next person, but if you're the sort who wants to go to battle in the science/religion wars, why you would choose to take up such a dubious weapon as M-theory mystifies me."

In Scientific American, John Horgan is not sympathetic to the book: "M-theory, theorists now realize, comes in an almost infinite number of versions, which "predict" an almost infinite number of possible universes. Critics call this the "Alice's Restaurant problem," a reference to the refrain of the old Arlo Guthrie folk song: "You can get anything you want at Alice's Restaurant." Of course, a theory that predicts everything really doesn't predict anything... The anthropic principle has always struck me as so dumb that I can't understand why anyone takes it seriously. It's cosmology's version of creationism. ... The physicist Tony Rothman, with whom I worked at Scientific American in the 1990s, liked to say that the anthropic principle in any form is completely ridiculous and hence should be called CRAP. ... Hawking is telling us that unconfirmable M-theory plus the anthropic tautology represents the end of that quest. If we believe him, the joke's on us."

The Economist is also critical of the book: Hawking and Mlodinow "...say that these surprising ideas have passed every experimental test to which they have been put, but that is misleading in a way that is unfortunately typical of the authors. It is the bare bones of quantum mechanics that have proved to be consistent with what is presently known of the subatomic world. The authors' interpretations and extrapolations of it have not been subjected to any decisive tests, and it is not clear that they ever could be. Once upon a time it was the province of philosophy to propose ambitious and outlandish theories in advance of any concrete evidence for them. Perhaps science, as Professor Hawking and Mr Mlodinow practice it in their airier moments, has indeed changed places with philosophy, though probably not quite in the way that they think."

The Bishop of Swindon, Dr. Lee Rayfield, said, "Science can never prove the non-existence of God, just as it can never prove the existence of God." Anglican priest, Cambridge theologian and psychologist Rev. Dr. Fraser N. Watts said "a creator God provides a reasonable and credible explanation of why there is a universe, and ... it is somewhat more likely that there is a God than that there is not. That view is not undermined by what Hawking has said."

British scientist Baroness Greenfield also criticized the book in an interview with BBC Radio: "Of course they can make whatever comments they like, but when they assume, rather in a Taliban-like way, that they have all the answers, then I do feel uncomfortable." She later claimed her Taliban remarks were "not intended to be personal", saying she "admired Stephen Hawking greatly" and "had no wish to compare him in particular to the Taliban".

Denis Alexander responded to Stephen Hawking's The Grand Design by stating that "the 'god' that Stephen Hawking is trying to debunk is not the creator God of the Abrahamic faiths who really is the ultimate explanation for why there is something rather than nothing", adding that "Hawking's god is a god-of-the-gaps used to plug present gaps in our scientific knowledge." "Science provides us with a wonderful narrative as to how [existence] may happen, but theology addresses the meaning of the narrative".

Mathematician and philosopher of science Wolfgang Smith wrote a chapter-by-chapter summary and critique of the book, first published in Sophia: The Journal of Traditional Studies, and subsequently published as "From Physics to Science Fiction: Response to Stephen Hawking" in the 2012 edition of his collection of essays, Science & Myth.

== See also ==
- A Brief History of Time – 1988 book by Stephen Hawking
- A Briefer History of Time – 2005 popular science book by Stephen Hawking
- Brief Answers to the Big Questions – 2018 popular science book by Stephen Hawking
- Model-dependent realism – View of scientific inquiry that focuses on the role of scientific models of phenomena
- A Question and Answer Guide to Astronomy
