= God Created the Integers =

2005 anthology by Stephen Hawking

- Cover of the first edition
- Author: Stephen Hawking
- Language: English
- Subject: Mathematics
- Publisher: Running Press
- Publication date: 2005 (first edition); 2007 (second edition)
- Media type: Print
- Pages: 1176
- ISBN: 9780762419227 (first edition); 9780762430048 (second edition)
- Preceded by: A Briefer History of Time
- Followed by: The Grand Design

God Created the Integers: The Mathematical Breakthroughs That Changed History is a 2005 anthology, edited by Stephen Hawking, of "excerpts from thirty-one of the most important works in the history of mathematics."

Each chapter of the work focuses on a different mathematician and begins with a biographical overview. Within each chapter, Hawking examines the mathematician's key discoveries, presents formal proofs of significant results, and explains their impact on the development of the mathematical field.

The title of the book is a reference to a quotation attributed to mathematician Leopold Kronecker, who once wrote that "God made the integers; all else is the work of man."

== Content ==
The works are grouped by author and ordered chronologically. Each section is prefaced by notes on the mathematician's life and work. The anthology includes works by the following mathematicians:

- Euclid
- Archimedes
- Diophantus
- René Descartes
- Isaac Newton
- Leonhard Euler
- Pierre-Simon Laplace
- Joseph Fourier
- Carl Friedrich Gauss
- Augustin-Louis Cauchy
- Nikolai Ivanovich Lobachevsky
- János Bolyai
- Évariste Galois
- George Boole
- Bernhard Riemann
- Karl Weierstrass
- Richard Dedekind
- Georg Cantor
- Henri Lebesgue
- Kurt Gödel
- Alan Turing

Selections from the works of Euler, Bolyai, Lobachevsky and Galois, which are included in the second edition of the book (published in 2007), were not included in the first edition.

== Editions ==
- Hawking, Stephen (2005). God Created the Integers: The Mathematical Breakthroughs That Changed History. Running Press Book Publishers. pp. 1160 (Hardback). ISBN 0-7624-1922-9.
- Hawking, Stephen (2007). God Created the Integers: The Mathematical Breakthroughs That Changed History. Running Press Book Publishers. pp. 1358 (Paperback). ISBN 978-0-7624-3004-8.
