= My Brief History =

Autobiography of Stephen Hawking

- Hardcover edition
- Author: Stephen Hawking
- Language: English
- Genre: Memoir
- Published: 2013 (Bantam Books)
- Publication place: United Kingdom
- Pages: 126 pp.
- ISBN: 9780345535283
- Preceded by: The Dreams That Stuff is Made of

My Brief History is a memoir published in 2013 by English physicist Stephen Hawking. The book recounts Hawking's journey from his post-war London boyhood to his years of international acclaim and celebrity.

== Reception ==
My Brief History has received modest praise from critics. Ian Sample of The Guardian wrote, "Hawking's memoir, My Brief History, is a skip across the surface of the Cambridge cosmologist's life, from his quirky upbringing in London and St Albans to his latest work on the beginning of time and the evolution of the universe. The details are sketched, but the brevity makes for a bold picture. Hawking's intellectual activity soars as his illness takes hold and eventually puts an intolerable burden on his marriages." Chuck Leddy of The Boston Globe similarly observed, "It's clear, though, that Hawking is more comfortable looking up at the universe than into himself, more concerned with detailing the evolution of a career than the twists and turns of a life, though he does reveal some interesting details about his beginnings as a scientist. In clean, direct prose, Hawking leads (readers) from his birth in Oxford in 1942 to the present."
