= The Universe in a Nutshell =

2001 Stephen Hawking's book

- First edition cover (UK)
- Author: Stephen Hawking
- Language: English
- Subject: Theoretical Physics
- Publisher: Bantam Spectra
- Publication date: 2001
- Publication place: United Kingdom
- Pages: 224
- ISBN: 0-553-80202-X
- OCLC: 46959876
- Dewey Decimal: 530.12 21
- LC Class: QC174.12 .H39 2001
- Preceded by: Black Holes and Baby Universes and Other Essays
- Followed by: On The Shoulders of Giants

The Universe in a Nutshell is a 2001 book about theoretical physics by Stephen Hawking. It is generally considered a sequel and was created to update the public concerning developments since the multi-million-copy bestseller A Brief History of Time was published in 1988.

== Content ==
In it Hawking explains to a general audience various matters relating to the Lucasian professor's work, such as Gödel's Incompleteness Theorem and P-branes (part of superstring theory in quantum mechanics). He tells the history and principles of modern physics. He seeks to "combine Einstein's General Theory of Relativity and Richard Feynman's idea of multiple histories into one complete unified theory that will describe everything that happens in the universe."

== Awards ==
The Universe in a Nutshell is winner of the Aventis Prizes for Science Books 2002.

== See also ==
- Roger Penrose
- Kip Thorne
- Physical cosmology
- Positivism
- List of textbooks on classical and quantum mechanics
- List of books on general relativity
