= Carol Christian =

American astronomer (born 1950)

- Born: December 28, 1950 (age 75); Cincinnati, Ohio, United States
- Education: Boston University
- Scientific career
- Fields: Astronomy
- Workplaces: Space Telescope Science Institute
- Thesis: Investigations of distant field stars and clusters in the galactic anticenter (1979)
- Doctoral advisor: Kenneth Janes
- Website: www.stsci.edu/~carolc/

Carol Ann Christian (born December 28, 1950) is an American astronomer and science communicator, who works for the Space Telescope Science Institute (STScI; the science operations center for the Hubble Space Telescope) as a scientist on the institute's outreach program.

Christian was born in Cincinnati, Ohio, and studied astronomy and physics at Boston University, from which she graduated with a PhD in 1979 with a thesis on Investigations of distant field stars and clusters in the galactic anticenter. She then worked as an astronomer for University of California, Berkeley. In 1992, Christian and her colleagues decided to establish Eureka Scientific as a conduit for grant applications of non-tenure-track astronomers after UC Berkeley did not sponsor her NASA grant proposal due to the lack of any tenure-track faculty position.

In August 1995, Christian was selected as the first head of STScI's new Office of Public Outreach after a national search. She has continued to act as an outreach scientist for the institute as a media spokesperson, educator and author. From 2003 to 2006, she worked as a scientific policy advisor for the State Department. In 2010, she co-authored A Question and Answer Guide to Astronomy with Pierre-Yves Bely and Jean-René Roy.
