= Hawking (2013 film) =

2013 film by Stephen Finnigan

- Directed by: Stephen Finnigan
- Written by: Ben Bowie; Stephen Finnigan; Stephen Hawking
- Produced by: Ben Bowie; Stephen Finnigan; David Glover; Beth Hoppe; Allan Niblo
- Starring: Stephen Hawking; Nathan Chapple; Martin King; Joe Lovell; Tina Lovell; Finlay Macrae; Tanya O'Regan; Arthur Pelling
- Cinematography: Paul Francis Jenkins
- Edited by: Tim Lovell
- Music by: Alex Lee; Nick Powell
- Distributed by: Darlow Smithson Productions, Channel 4, PBS, Vertigo Films
- Release date: 20 September 2013
- Running time: 94 minutes
- Country: United Kingdom
- Language: English

Hawking (also known as Hawking: Brief History of Mine) is a 2013 British biographical documentary film about Stephen Hawking directed by Stephen Finnigan and features Hawking himself, depicting his love life, his struggle with amyotrophic lateral sclerosis and his later recognition as a world-famous scientist.

== Cast ==
Interviews are conducted with Jane Wilde Hawking, Kip Thorne, Benedict Cumberbatch, Buzz Aldrin, Richard Branson, members of Hawking's family and colleagues, and several others.

- Stephen Hawking as himself (narrating via his Equalizer computerized voice)
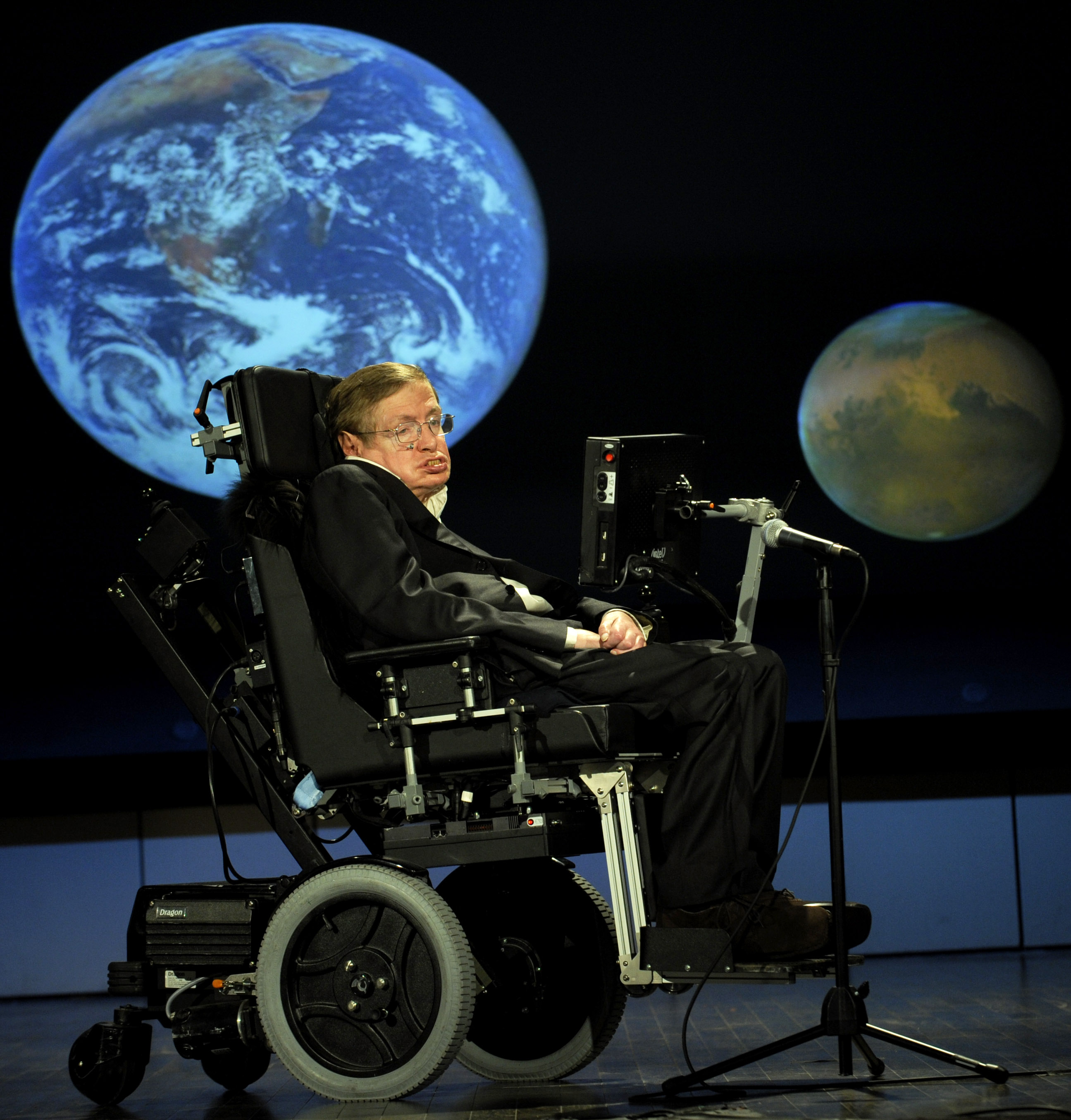
- Hawking in 2008 at George Washington University's Morton Auditorium horning NASA's 50th anniversary.
  Nathan Chapple as Stephen Hawking (young adult)
- Martin King as Stephen Hawking (adult)
- Joe Lovell as Stephen Hawking (adult)
- Tina Lovell as Jane Hawking
- Finlay Macrae as Stephen Hawking (teenager)
- Tanya O'Regan as Jane Hawking
- Arthur Pelling as Stephen Hawking (child)
- Walt Woltosz as himself

== See also ==
- Hawking (2004 film), featuring Benedict Cumberbatch as Hawking
- The Theory of Everything (2014 film), starring Eddie Redmayne as Hawking
