= Stephen Hawking =

English theoretical physicist (1942–2018)

Stephen Hawking CH CBE FRS FRSA
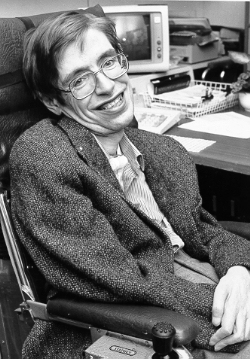
- Hawking, c. 1980
- Born: 8 January 1942; Oxford, England
- Died: 14 March 2018 (aged 76); Cambridge, England
- Resting place: Ashes interred at Westminster Abbey
- Education: University College, Oxford (BA); Trinity Hall, Cambridge (PhD)
- Known for: See list: Hawking radiation; A Brief History of Time; A Briefer History of Time; Penrose–Hawking theorems; Black hole information paradox; Micro black hole; Primordial black hole; Chronology protection conjecture; Soft hair (No hair theorem); Bekenstein–Hawking formula; Hawking energy; Hawking–Page phase transition; Gibbons–Hawking ansatz; Gibbons–Hawking effect; Gibbons–Hawking space; Gibbons–Hawking–York boundary term; Hartle–Hawking state; Thorne–Hawking–Preskill bet
- Spouses: Jane Wilde (m. 1965; div. 1995); Elaine Mason (m. 1995; div. 2006)
- Children: 3, including Lucy
- Awards: See list: Adams Prize (1966); Eddington Medal (1975); The William Hopkins Prize (1975); Maxwell Medal and Prize (1976); Heineman Prize (1976); Hughes Medal (1976); Albert Einstein Award (1978); Albert Einstein Medal (1979); RAS Gold Medal (1985); Dirac Medal (IOP) (1987); Wolf Prize (1988); Prince of Asturias Award (1989); Foreign Associate of the National Academy of Sciences (1992); Andrew Gemant Award (1998); Naylor Prize and Lectureship (1999); Lilienfeld Prize (1999); Albert Medal (1999); Copley Medal (2006); Presidential Medal of Freedom (2009); Breakthrough Prize in Fundamental Physics (2012); BBVA Foundation Frontiers of Knowledge Award (2015)
- Scientific career
- Fields: General relativity; Cosmology; Quantum gravity
- Workplaces: University of Cambridge
- Thesis: Properties of Expanding Universes (1966)
- Doctoral advisor: Dennis W. Sciama
- Other academic advisors: Robert Berman
- Doctoral students: See list: Bruce Allen; Raphael Bousso; Bernard Carr; Fay Dowker; Christophe Galfard; Gary Gibbons; Thomas Hertog; Raymond Laflamme; Don Page; Malcolm Perry; Christopher Pope; Marika Taylor; Alan Yuille; Wu Zhongchao; 27 others
- Website: hawking.org.uk

Stephen William Hawking (8 January 1942 – 14 March 2018) was an English theoretical astrophysicist, cosmologist, and author who was director of research at the Centre for Theoretical Cosmology at the University of Cambridge. Between 1979 and 2009, he was the Lucasian Professor of Mathematics at Cambridge, widely viewed as one of the most prestigious academic posts in the world.

Hawking was born in Oxford into a family of physicians. In 1959, at the age of 17, he began his university education at University College, Oxford, where he received a first-class BA degree in physics. In 1962, he began his graduate work at Trinity Hall, Cambridge, where, in 1966, he obtained his PhD in applied mathematics and theoretical physics, specialising in general relativity and cosmology. In 1963, at age 21, Hawking was diagnosed with an early-onset slow-progressing form of motor neurone disease that gradually, over decades, paralysed him. After the loss of his speech, he communicated through a speech-generating device, initially through use of a handheld switch, and eventually by using a single cheek muscle.

Hawking's scientific works included a collaboration with Roger Penrose on gravitational singularity theorems in the framework of general relativity, and the theoretical prediction that black holes emit radiation, often called Hawking radiation. Initially, Hawking radiation was controversial. By the late 1970s, and following the publication of further research, the discovery was widely accepted as a major breakthrough in theoretical physics. Hawking was the first to set out a theory of cosmology explained by a union of the general theory of relativity and quantum mechanics. He supported the many-worlds interpretation of quantum mechanics. He also introduced the notion of a micro black hole.

Hawking achieved commercial success with several works of popular science in which he discussed his theories and cosmology in general. His book A Brief History of Time appeared on the Sunday Times bestseller list for a record-breaking 237 weeks. Hawking was a Fellow of the Royal Society, a lifetime member of the Pontifical Academy of Sciences, and a recipient of the Presidential Medal of Freedom, the highest civilian award in the United States. In 2002, Hawking was ranked number 25 in the BBC's poll of the 100 Greatest Britons. He died in 2018 at the age of 76, having lived more than 50 years following his diagnosis of motor neurone disease.

== Early life ==
=== Family ===
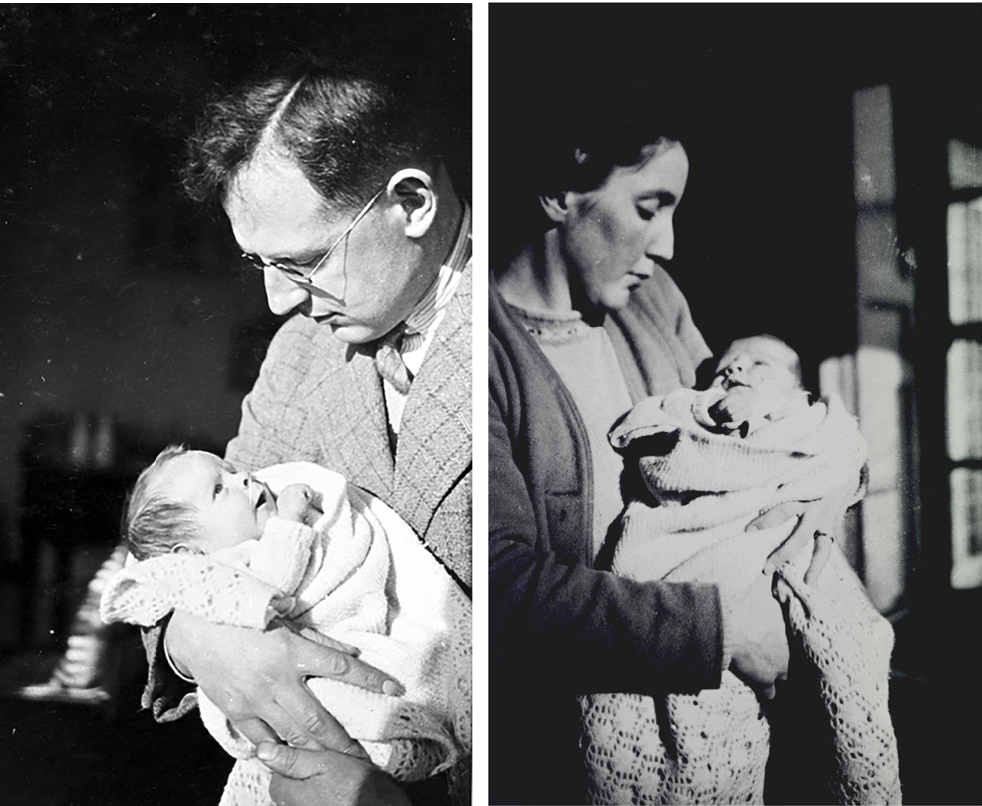
Hawking with his parents, 1942

Stephen William Hawking was born on 8 January 1942 in Oxford to Frank and Isobel Eileen Hawking (née Walker). Hawking's mother was born into a family of doctors in Glasgow, Scotland. His wealthy paternal great-grandfather, from Yorkshire, over-extended himself buying farm land and then went bankrupt in the great agricultural depression during the early 20th century. His paternal great-grandmother saved the family from financial ruin by opening a school in their home. Despite their families' financial constraints, both parents attended the University of Oxford, where Frank read medicine and Isobel read Philosophy, Politics and Economics. Isobel worked as a secretary for a medical research institute, and Frank was a medical researcher specialising in tropical diseases. Hawking said of his father, "I modelled myself on him. Because he was a scientific researcher, I felt that scientific research was the natural thing to do when one grew up. The only difference was that I was not attracted to medicine or biology because they seemed too inexact and descriptive. I wanted something more fundamental, and I found it in physics."

In 1950, when Hawking's father became head of the division of parasitology at the National Institute for Medical Research, the family moved to St Albans, Hertfordshire. There, the family was considered highly intelligent and somewhat eccentric; meals were often spent with each person silently reading a book. They lived a frugal existence in a large, cluttered, and poorly maintained house and travelled in a converted London taxicab. During one of Hawking's father's frequent absences working in Africa, the rest of the family spent four months in Mallorca visiting his mother's friend Beryl and her husband, the poet Robert Graves.

=== Primary and secondary school years ===
Hawking began his schooling at the Byron House School in Highgate, London. He later blamed its "progressive methods" for his failure to learn to read while at the school. In St Albans, the eight-year-old Hawking attended St Albans High School for Girls for a few months. At that time, younger boys could attend one of the houses.

Hawking attended two private (i.e. fee-paying) schools, first Radlett School and from September 1952, St Albans School, Hertfordshire, after passing the eleven-plus a year early. The family placed a high value on education. Hawking's father wanted his son to attend Westminster School, but the 13-year-old Hawking was ill on the day of the scholarship examination. His family could not afford the school fees without the financial aid of a scholarship, so Hawking remained at St Albans. A positive consequence was that Hawking remained close to a group of friends with whom he enjoyed board games, the manufacture of fireworks, model aeroplanes and boats, and long discussions about Christianity and extrasensory perception. From 1958 on, with the help of the mathematics teacher Dikran Tahta, they built a computer from clock parts, an old telephone switchboard and other recycled components. In 1959, he built a record player from spare parts: "My father would have regarded it as recklessly self-indulgent, to buy a record player, but I persuaded him that I could assemble one from parts that I could buy cheap. That appealed to him as a Yorkshireman."

Although known at school as "Einstein", Hawking was not initially successful academically. With time, he began to show considerable aptitude for scientific subjects and, inspired by Tahta, decided to study mathematics at university. Hawking's father advised him to study medicine, concerned that there were few jobs for mathematics graduates. He also wanted his son to attend University College, Oxford, his own alma mater. As it was not possible to read mathematics there at the time, Hawking decided to study physics and chemistry. Despite his headmaster's advice to wait until the next year, Hawking was awarded a scholarship after taking the examinations in March 1959.

=== Undergraduate years ===
In October 1959, at the age of 17, Hawking began his university education at University College, Oxford. For the first eighteen months, he was bored and lonely – he found the academic work "ridiculously easy". His physics tutor, Robert Berman, later said, "It was only necessary for him to know that something could be done, and he could do it without looking to see how other people did it." A change occurred during his second and third years when, according to Berman, Hawking made more of an effort "to be one of the boys". He developed into a popular, lively, and witty student, interested in classical music and science fiction. This partially resulted from his decision to join Oxford's University College Boat Club, where he coxed a rowing crew. The rowing coach at the time noted that Hawking cultivated a daredevil image, steering his crew on risky courses that led to damaged boats. Hawking estimated that he studied about 1,000 hours during his three years at Oxford. These unimpressive study habits made sitting his finals a challenge, and he decided to answer only theoretical physics questions rather than those requiring factual knowledge. A first-class degree was a condition of acceptance for his planned graduate study in cosmology at the University of Cambridge. Anxious, he slept poorly the night before the examinations, and the result was on the borderline between first- and second-class honours, making a viva (oral examination) with the Oxford examiners necessary.

Hawking was concerned that he was viewed as a lazy and difficult student. So, when asked at the viva to describe his plans, he said, "If you award me a First, I will go to Cambridge. If I receive a Second, I shall stay in Oxford, so I expect you will give me a First." He was held in higher regard than he believed; as Berman commented, the examiners "were intelligent enough to realise they were talking to someone far cleverer than most of themselves". After receiving a first-class BA degree in physics and completing a trip to Iran with a friend, he began his graduate work at Trinity Hall, Cambridge, in October 1962.

=== Postgraduate years ===
Hawking's first year as a doctoral student was difficult. He was initially disappointed to find that he had been assigned Dennis William Sciama, one of the founders of modern cosmology, as a supervisor rather than the noted astronomer Fred Hoyle, and he found his training in mathematics inadequate for work in general relativity and cosmology. After being diagnosed with motor neurone disease, Hawking fell into a depression. Although his doctors advised that he continue with his studies, he felt there was little point. His disease progressed more slowly than doctors had predicted. Although Hawking had difficulty walking unsupported, and his speech was almost unintelligible, an initial diagnosis that he had only two years to live proved unfounded. With Sciama's encouragement, he returned to his work. Hawking started developing a reputation for intelligence and brashness after a lecture in June 1964, at which he publicly challenged the work of Hoyle and his student Jayant Narlikar.

== Career ==
=== 1966–1975 ===
When Hawking began his doctoral studies, there was much debate in the physics community about the prevailing theories of the creation of the universe: the Big Bang and Steady-state theories. Inspired by Roger Penrose's theorem of a spacetime singularity in the centre of black holes, Hawking applied the same thinking to the entire universe; and, during 1965, he wrote his thesis on this topic.

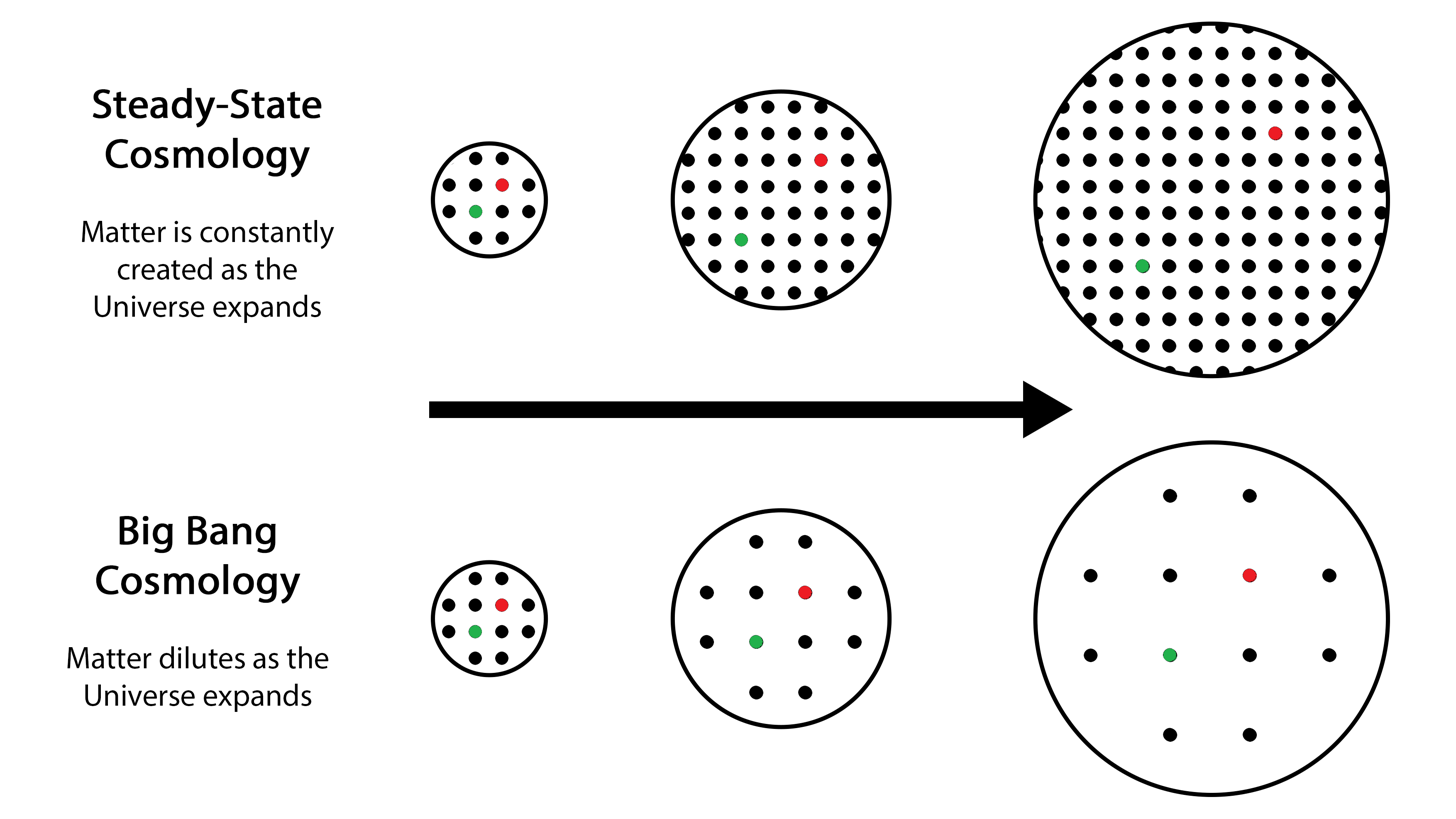
In the Big Bang theory regarding the origins of the universe, the universe's expansion causes matter to dilute over time (depicted left-to-right), while in the Steady-state model, continued matter creation ensures that the density remains constant over time.

A representation of gravity pulling space past the event horizon of a black hole and towards its gravitational singularity

Hawking's thesis, Properties of Expanding Universes, was approved in 1966. He also received a research fellowship at Gonville and Caius College at Cambridge; he obtained his PhD degree in applied mathematics and theoretical physics, specialising in general relativity and cosmology, in March 1966; and his essay "Singularities and the Geometry of Space–Time" shared top honours with one by Penrose to win that year's prestigious Adams Prize. In 1969, Hawking accepted a specially created Fellowship for Distinction in Science to remain at Caius.

Collaborating with Penrose, Hawking extended the singularity theorem concepts first explored in Properties of Expanding Universes. This included not only the existence of singularities, but also the theory that the universe might have started as a singularity. Their joint essay was the runner-up in the 1968 Gravity Research Foundation competition. In 1970, they published a proof that if the universe obeys the theory of general relativity, and fits any of the models of physical cosmology developed by Alexander Friedmann, then it must have begun as a singularity. Hawking's early 1970s work with Brandon Carter, Werner Israel, and David C. Robinson strongly supported John Archibald Wheeler's no-hair theorem, that regardless of how a black hole is formed, it only exhibits three properties: mass, electrical charge, and rotation.

Hawking's essay titled "Black Holes" won the Gravity Research Foundation Award in January 1971. His first book, The Large Scale Structure of Space–Time, written with George Ellis, was published in 1973. Hawking was elected a Fellow of the Royal Society (FRS) in 1974, becoming one of the youngest scientists to become a Fellow.

In 1973, Hawking and James M. Bardeen developed the four laws of black hole mechanics, drawing an analogy with thermodynamics. Hawking's second law mentions gravitational waves—waves of warped spacetime caused by the changing gravitational field around two black holes merging. First proposed by Oliver Heaviside in 1893, they were theoretical until they were first observed in 2015. Hawking's law states that even though black holes lose energy (or "have an entropy") from gravitational waves and increasing angular momentum from their rotation, which can both reduce its surface area, the total surface area of two merged black holes must increase or remain the same.

A simulation of a black hole merger

A simulation showing gravitational waves—waves of curved spacetime—forming due to the changing gravitational field around a merger

Around this time, Hawking moved into the study of quantum gravity and quantum mechanics. This was spurred by a visit to Moscow, in which he talked with Yakov Zeldovich and Alexei Starobinsky, whose work showed that, according to the uncertainty principle, rotating black holes emit particles. To Hawking's annoyance, his calculations to prove their work produced findings that contradicted his second law. It did, however, support Jacob Bekenstein's 1972 theory that black holes have an entropy proportional to the area of the event horizon. Hawking's law was nonetheless validated in 2025 by analysis of black hole merger GW250114.

In 1974, Hawking claimed that black holes emit radiation, known today as Hawking radiation, which may continue until they exhaust their energy and evaporate. Initially, Hawking radiation was controversial. John G. Taylor dismissed it as "absolute rubbish" after a lecture by Hawking. Following the publication of further research, by the late 1970s, the discovery was widely accepted as a significant breakthrough in theoretical physics. While some experimental teams have claimed detection of Hawking radiation from acoustic and optical analogues of black holes, some of these results remain in doubt. The search for Hawking radiation from astrophysical ones continues in the twenty-first century.

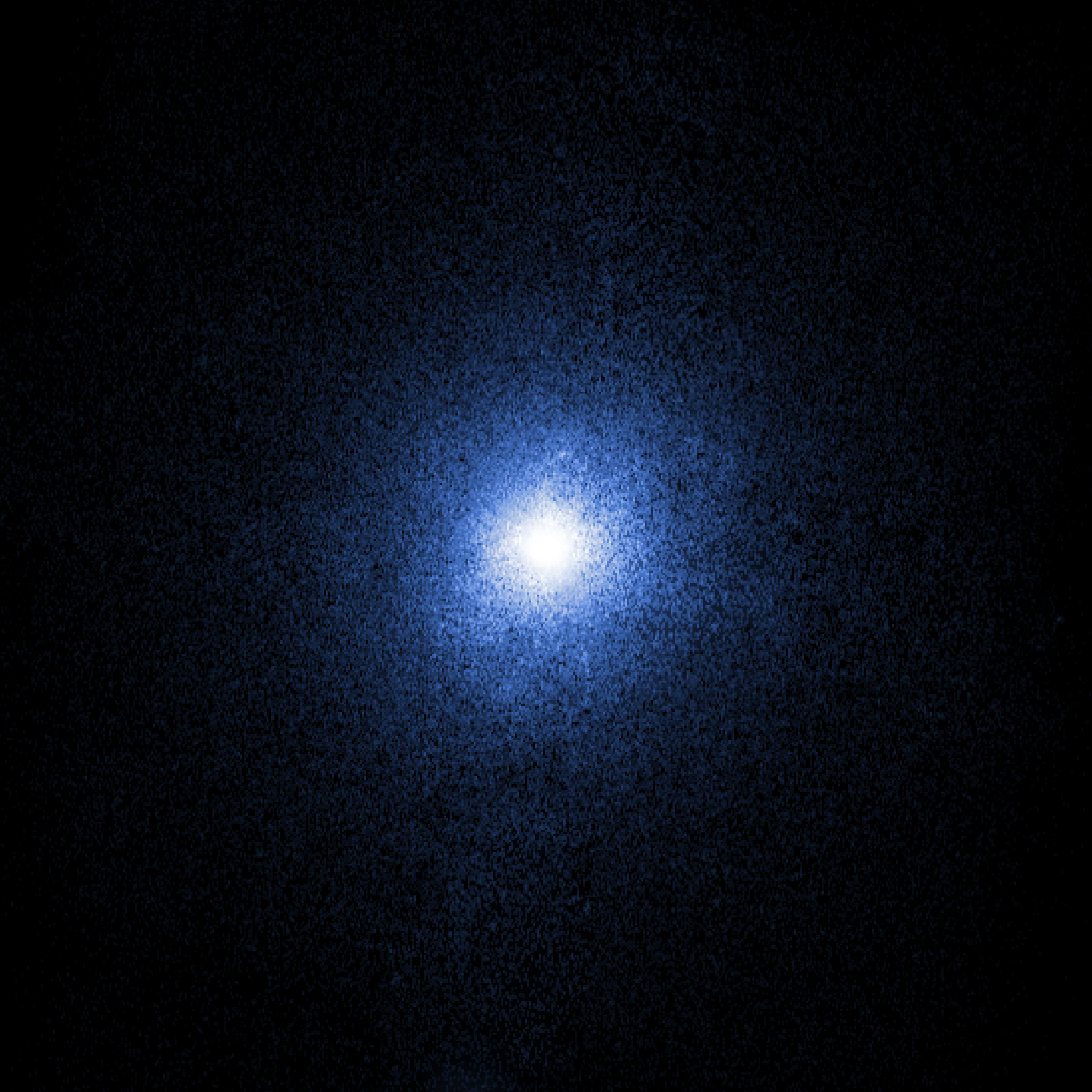
A 2009 image of the black hole candidate Cygnus X-1 by the Chandra X-ray Observatory

Hawking was appointed to the Sherman Fairchild Distinguished Visiting Professorship at the California Institute of Technology (Caltech) in 1974. He worked with a friend on the faculty, Kip Thorne, and engaged him in a scientific wager about whether the astrophysical X-ray source Cygnus X-1 was a black hole. For Hawking, the wager was an "insurance policy" against the possibility that black holes did not exist. Hawking conceded he had lost the bet in 1990. This bet was the first of several he made with Thorne and others.

Hawking maintained his ties to Caltech, spending a month there almost every year since this first visit.

=== 1975–1990 ===
Hawking returned to Cambridge in 1975 to a more academically senior post, as reader in gravitational physics. The mid-to-late 1970s were a period of growing public interest in black holes and the physicists who were studying them. Hawking was regularly interviewed for print and television. He also received increasing academic recognition of his work. In 1975, he was awarded both the Eddington Medal and the Pius XI Gold Medal, and in 1976 the Dannie Heineman Prize, the Maxwell Medal and Prize, and the Hughes Medal. He was appointed a professor with a chair in gravitational physics in 1977. The following year, he received the Albert Einstein Medal and an honorary doctorate from the University of Oxford.

In 1979, Hawking was elected Lucasian Professor of Mathematics at the University of Cambridge. His inaugural lecture in this role was titled: "Is the End in Sight for Theoretical Physics?" and proposed N = 8 supergravity as the leading theory to solve many of the outstanding problems physicists were studying. His promotion coincided with a health-crisis which led to his accepting, albeit reluctantly, some nursing services at home. At the same time, he was also making a transition in his approach to physics, becoming more intuitive and speculative rather than insisting on mathematical proofs. "I would rather be right than rigorous", he told Kip Thorne. In 1981, he proposed that information in a black hole is irretrievably lost when a black hole evaporates. This information paradox violates the fundamental tenet of quantum mechanics, and led to years of debate, including "the Black Hole War" with Leonard Susskind and Gerard 't Hooft.

Cosmological inflation—a theory proposing that following the Big Bang, the universe initially expanded incredibly rapidly before settling down to a slower expansion—was proposed by Alan Guth and also developed by Andrei Linde. Following a conference in Moscow in October 1981, Hawking and Gary Gibbons organised a three-week Nuffield Workshop in the summer of 1982 on "The Very Early Universe" at Cambridge University, a workshop that focused mainly on inflation theory. Hawking also began a new line of quantum-theory research into the origin of the universe. In 1981, at a Vatican conference, he presented work suggesting that there might be no boundary—or beginning or ending—to the universe.

Hawking subsequently developed the research in collaboration with Jim Hartle, and in 1983 they published a model, known as the Hartle–Hawking state. It proposed that prior to the Planck epoch, the universe had no boundary in spacetime; before the Big Bang, time did not exist and the concept of the beginning of the universe is meaningless. The initial singularity of the classical Big Bang models was replaced with a region akin to the North Pole. One cannot travel north of the North Pole, but there is no boundary there – it is simply the point where all north-running lines meet and end. Initially, the no-boundary proposal predicted a closed universe, which had implications about the existence of God. As Hawking explained, "if the universe has no boundaries but is self-contained... then God would not have had any freedom to choose how the universe began."

Further work by Hawking in the area of arrows of time led to the 1985 publication of a paper theorising that if the no-boundary proposition were correct, then when the universe stopped expanding and eventually collapsed, time would run backwards. A paper by Don Page and independent calculations by Raymond Laflamme led Hawking to withdraw this concept.

In 1982, to finance his children's education and home-expenses, Hawking decided to write a popular book about the universe that would be accessible to the general public. Instead of publishing with an academic press, he signed a contract with Bantam Books, a mass-market publisher, and received a large advance for his book. A first draft of the book, called A Brief History of Time, was completed in 1984.

One of the first messages Hawking produced with his speech-generating device was a request for his assistant to help him finish writing A Brief History of Time. Peter Guzzardi, his editor at Bantam, pushed him to explain his ideas clearly in non-technical language, a process that required many revisions from an increasingly irritated Hawking. The book was published in April 1988 in the US and in June in the UK, and it proved to be an extraordinary success, rising quickly to the top of best-seller lists in both countries and remaining there for months. The book was translated into many languages, and as of 2009, has sold an estimated 9 million copies.

Media attention was intense, and a Newsweek magazine-cover and a television special both described him as "Master of the Universe". Success led to significant financial rewards, but also the challenges of celebrity status. Hawking travelled extensively to promote his work, and enjoyed partying into the late hours. A difficulty refusing the invitations and visitors left him limited time for work and his students. Some colleagues were resentful of the attention Hawking received, feeling it was due to his disability.

=== 1990–2000 ===
In 1992, Hawking conjectured that travel into the past is effectively impossible. On 28 June 2009, as a tongue-in-cheek test of the conjecture, he held a party open to all, complete with food and drinks, but publicised the party only after it was over so that only time-travellers would know to attend; as expected, nobody showed up.

Hawking pursued his work in physics: in 1993, he co-edited a book on Euclidean quantum gravity with Gary Gibbons and published a collected edition of his own articles on black holes and the Big Bang. In 1994, at Cambridge's Newton Institute, Hawking and Penrose delivered a series of six lectures that were published in 1996 as "The Nature of Space and Time".

In 1997, he conceded a 1991 public scientific wager made with Kip Thorne and John Preskill of Caltech. Hawking had bet that Penrose's proposal of a "cosmic censorship conjecture" – that there could be no "naked singularities" unclothed within a horizon – was correct. After discovering his concession might have been premature, a more refined wager was made, specifying that such singularities would occur without extra conditions. The same year, Thorne, Hawking, and Preskill made another bet, this time concerning the black hole information paradox. Thorne and Hawking argued that since general relativity made it impossible for black holes to radiate and lose information, the mass-energy and information carried by Hawking radiation must be "new", and not from inside the event horizon. Since this contradicted the quantum mechanics of microcausality, quantum mechanics theory would need to be rewritten. Preskill argued the opposite, that since quantum mechanics suggests that the information emitted by a black hole relates to information that fell in at an earlier time, the concept of black holes given by general relativity must be modified in some way.

Hawking also maintained his public profile, including bringing science to a wider audience. The documentary A Brief History of Time, directed by Errol Morris, premiered in 1991; the film contains material from the book as well as interviews with Hawking, his friends, family, and colleagues. Hawking had wanted the film to be scientific rather than biographical, but he was persuaded otherwise. The film, while a critical success, was not widely released. A popular-level collection of essays, interviews, and talks titled Black Holes and Baby Universes and Other Essays was published in 1993. A six-part television series Stephen Hawking's Universe and a companion book appeared in 1997; as Hawking insisted, the focus was entirely on science.

=== 2000–2018 ===
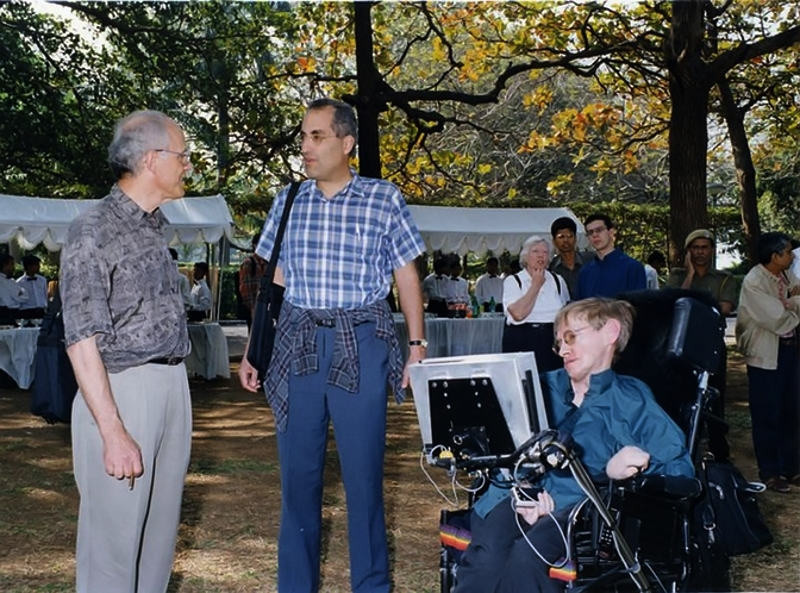
Hawking, with David Gross and Edward Witten at the 2001 Strings Conference at the Tata Institute of Fundamental Research, India.

Hawking continued his writings for a popular audience, publishing The Universe in a Nutshell in 2001, and A Briefer History of Time, which he wrote in 2005 with Leonard Mlodinow to update his earlier works with the aim of making them accessible to a wider audience, and God Created the Integers, which appeared in 2006. Along with Thomas Hertog at CERN and Jim Hartle, from 2006 on, Hawking developed a theory of top-down cosmology, which says that the universe had not one unique initial state but many different ones, and therefore that it is inappropriate to formulate a theory that predicts the universe's current configuration from one particular initial state. Top-down cosmology posits that the present "selects" the past from a superposition of many possible histories. In doing so, the theory suggests a possible resolution of the fine-tuning question.

By 2003, consensus among physicists was growing that Hawking was wrong about the loss of information in a black hole. In a 2004 lecture in Dublin, he conceded his 1997 bet with Preskill, but described his own, somewhat controversial solution to the information paradox problem, involving the possibility that black holes have more than one topology. In the 2005 paper he published on the subject, he argued that the information paradox was explained by examining all the alternative histories of universes, with the information loss in those with black holes being cancelled out by those without such loss. In January 2014, he called the alleged loss of information in black holes his "biggest blunder". In August 2015, Hawking said that not all information is lost when something enters a black hole and there might be a possibility to retrieve information from a black hole according to his theory.

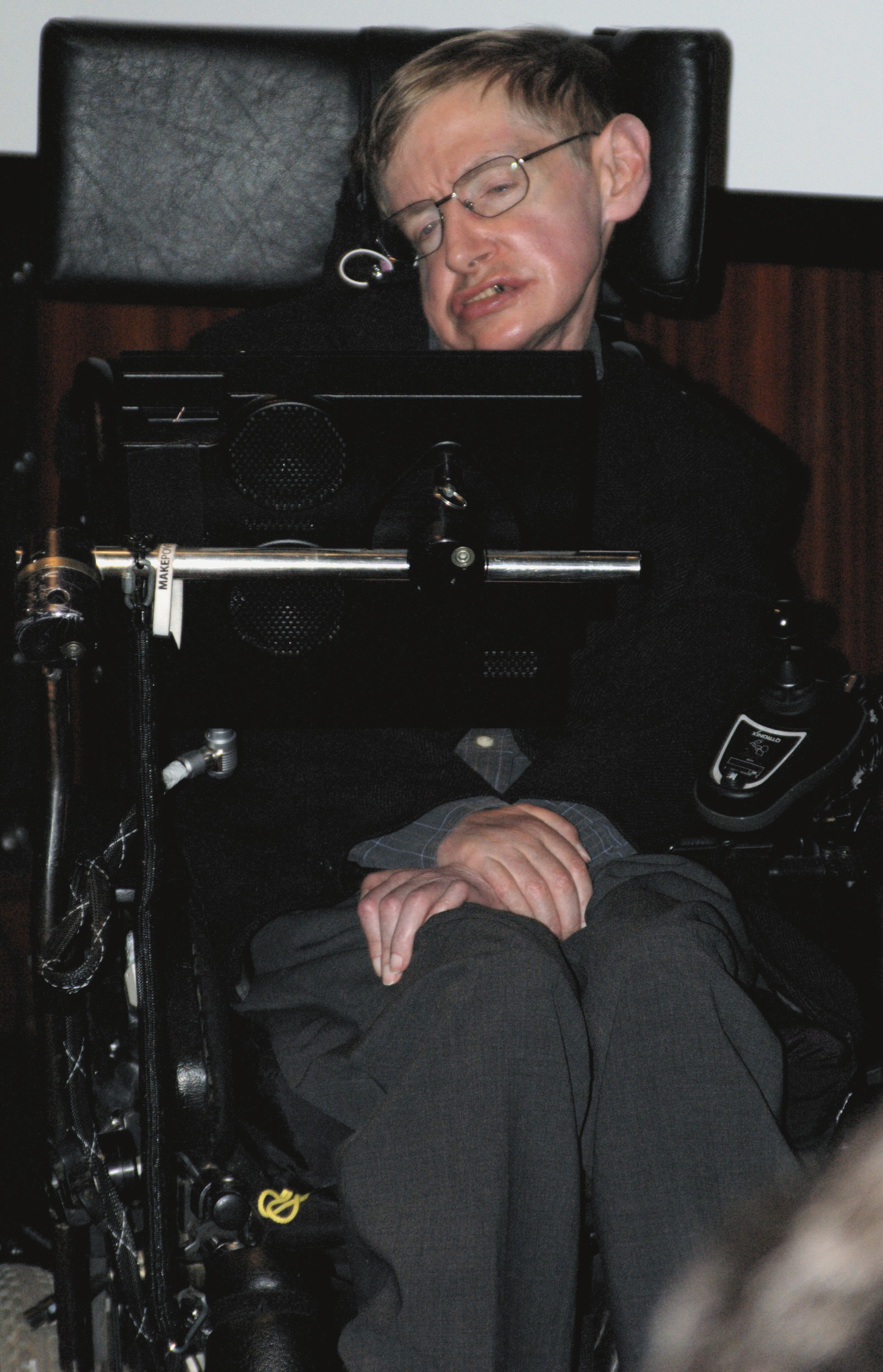
Hawking in 2006

As part of another longstanding scientific dispute, Hawking had emphatically argued, and bet, that the Higgs boson would never be found. The particle was proposed to exist as part of the Higgs field theory by Peter Higgs in 1964. Hawking and Higgs engaged in a heated and public debate over the matter in 2002 and again in 2008, with Higgs criticising Hawking's work and complaining that Hawking's "celebrity status gives him instant credibility that others do not have". The particle was discovered in July 2012 at CERN following construction of the Large Hadron Collider. Hawking quickly conceded that he had lost his bet and said that Higgs should win the Nobel Prize for Physics, which he did in 2013.

In 2007, Hawking and his daughter Lucy published George's Secret Key to the Universe, a children's book designed to explain theoretical physics in an accessible fashion and featuring characters similar to those in the Hawking family. The book was followed by sequels in 2009, 2011, 2014 and 2016. Hawking created Stephen Hawking: Expedition New Earth, a 2017 documentary on space colonisation, as an episode of Tomorrow's World.

During his career, Hawking supervised 39 successful PhD students. As required by Cambridge University policy for professors who have reached the age of 67, Hawking retired as Lucasian Professor of Mathematics in 2009. Despite suggestions that he might leave the U.K. as a protest against public funding cuts to basic scientific research, Hawking worked as director of research at the Cambridge University Department of Applied Mathematics and Theoretical Physics.

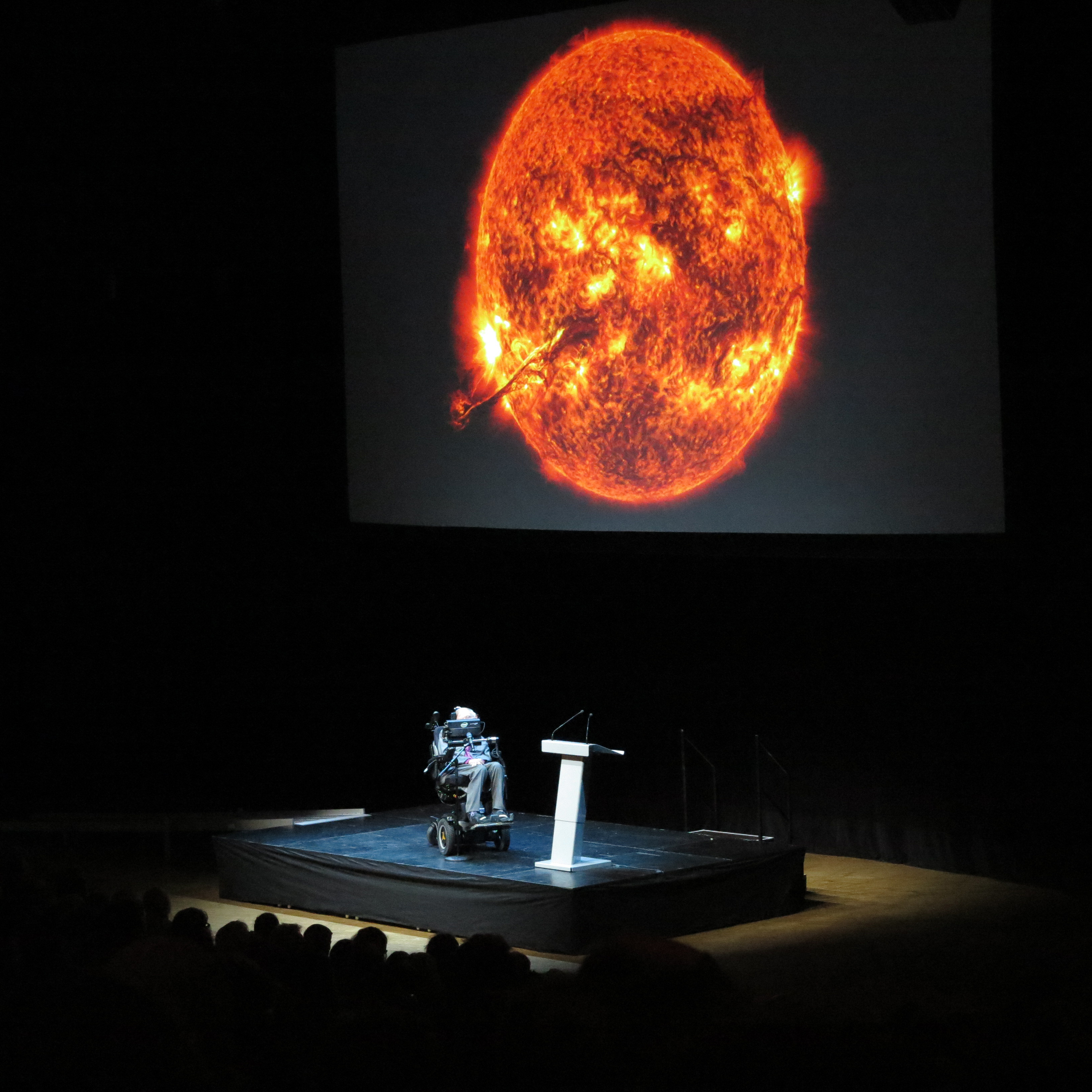
Hawking lecturing at the Stockholm Waterfront congress centre in 2015

On 20 July 2015, Hawking helped launch Breakthrough Initiatives, an effort to search for extraterrestrial life.

Properties of Expanding Universes was made publicly accessible by Cambridge University in October 2017. It quickly became the most requested item in the university's open-access repository. In Hawking's final broadcast interview, given that same month, he spoke of the scientific importance of GW170817, a black hole merger. The interview was broadcast in April 2018, after his death, as the Smithsonian TV Channel documentary Leaving Earth: Or How to Colonize a Planet.

Hawking's final paper, A smooth exit from eternal inflation?, was posthumously published in the Journal of High Energy Physics on 27 April 2018. In October 2018, one of his final research studies, entitled Black Hole Entropy and Soft Hair, was published, and dealt with the fate of information which enters black holes. Also that October, Hawking's last book was published, Brief Answers to the Big Questions, containing his final comments on what he believed were the most important questions facing humankind.

== Personal views ==
=== Relevance of philosophy ===
At Google's Zeitgeist Conference in 2011, Stephen Hawking said that "philosophy is dead". He believed that philosophers "have not kept up with modern developments in science", "have not taken science sufficiently seriously and so Philosophy is no longer relevant to knowledge claims", "their art is dead" and that scientists "have become the bearers of the torch of discovery in our quest for knowledge". He said that philosophical problems can be answered by science, particularly new scientific theories which "lead us to a new and very different picture of the universe and our place in it". His view was both praised and criticised. He said, "Love, faith, and morality belong to a different category to physics. You cannot deduce how one should behave from the laws of physics. But one could hope that the logical thought that physics and mathematics involves would guide one also in one's moral behaviour."

=== Future of humanity ===
In 2006, Hawking posed an open question on the Internet: "In a world that is in chaos politically, socially and environmentally, how can the human race sustain another 100 years?", later clarifying: "I don't know the answer. That is why I asked the question, to get people to think about it, and to be aware of the dangers we now face."

Hawking expressed concern that life on Earth is at risk from a sudden nuclear war, a genetically engineered virus, global warming, an asteroid collision, or other dangers humans have not yet thought of. Hawking stated: "I regard it as almost inevitable that either a nuclear confrontation or environmental catastrophe will cripple the Earth at some point in the next 1,000 years". He also thought that a planet-wide disaster need not result in human extinction if the human race were to be able to colonise additional planets before the disaster. Hawking viewed spaceflight and the colonisation of space as necessary for the future of humanity.

Hawking stated that, given the vastness of the universe, aliens likely exist, but that contact with them should be avoided. He warned that aliens might pillage Earth for resources. In 2010, he said: "If aliens visit us, the outcome would be much as when Columbus landed in America, which didn't turn out well for the Native Americans."

Hawking warned that superintelligent artificial intelligence could be pivotal in steering humanity's fate, stating that "the potential benefits are huge... Success in creating AI would be the biggest event in human history. It might also be the last, unless we learn how to avoid the risks." He feared that "an extremely intelligent future AI will probably develop a drive to survive and acquire more resources as a step toward accomplishing whatever goal it has", and that "the real risk with AI isn't malice, but competence. A super-intelligent AI will be extremely good at accomplishing its goals, and if those goals aren't aligned with ours, we're in trouble". He also considered that the enormous wealth generated by machines needs to be redistributed to prevent exacerbated economic inequality.

Hawking was concerned about the future emergence of a race of "superhumans" that would be able to design their own evolution and, as well, argued that computer viruses in today's world should be considered a new form of life, stating that "maybe it says something about human nature, that the only form of life we have created so far is purely destructive. Talk about creating life in our own image."

=== Religion and atheism ===
Hawking did not rule out the existence of God, writing in A Brief History of Time: "Is the unified theory so compelling that it brings about its own existence?", also stating "If we discover a complete theory, it would be the ultimate triumph of human reason – for then we should know the mind of God"; in his early work, Hawking spoke of God in a metaphorical sense. In the same book, he suggested that the existence of God was not necessary to explain the origin of the universe. Later discussions with Neil Turok led to the realisation that the existence of God was also compatible with an open universe. He said: "All my work has shown is that you don't have to say that the way the universe began was the personal whim of God. But you still have the question, 'Why does the universe bother to exist?' If you like, you can define God as the answer to that question."

Hawking was an atheist. In a 2011 interview, Hawking regarded the brain "as a computer which will stop working when its components fail", and the concept of an afterlife as a "fairy story for people afraid of the dark". In 2011, narrating the first episode of the American television series Curiosity on the Discovery Channel, Hawking declared:

We are each free to believe what we want and it is my view that the simplest explanation is there is no God. No one created the universe and no one directs our fate. This leads me to a profound realisation. There is probably no heaven, and no afterlife either. We have this one life to appreciate the grand design of the universe, and for that, I am extremely grateful.

Hawking's association with atheism and freethinking was in evidence from his university years onwards, when he had been a member of Oxford University's humanist group. He was later scheduled to appear as the keynote speaker at a 2017 Humanists UK conference. In a 2014 interview, he said:

Before we understand science, it is natural to believe that God created the universe. But now science offers a more convincing explanation. What I meant by 'we would know the mind of God' is, we would know everything that God would know, if there were a God, which there isn't. I'm an atheist.

In addition, Hawking stated:

If you like, you can call the laws of science 'God', but it wouldn't be a personal God that you would meet and put questions to.

=== Politics ===
Hawking was a longstanding Labour Party supporter. His endorsement of them in the 2017 UK general election cited the Conservative Party's proposed cuts to the National Health Service (NHS), but he was openly critical of Labour's ability to win a general election under party leader Jeremy Corbyn. Hawking once recorded a video tribute to the Democratic Party candidate in the 2000 U.S. presidential election, Al Gore.

Hawking supported universal health care, and maintained that without the NHS, he would not have survived into his 70s. He especially feared privatisation of healthcare in the UK, stating: "The more profit is extracted from the system, the more private monopolies grow and the more expensive healthcare becomes. The NHS must be preserved from commercial interests and protected from those who want to privatise it." Hawking criticized the Conservatives for wanting to privatise the NHS, and for cutting funding to it as a result. He was also in favour of increasing the numbers of doctors and nurses in the NHS. Hawking also supported a universal basic income.

Before the 2014 referendum on Scottish independence from the UK, Hawking was one of two hundred public figures who signed a letter endorsing a vote against independence. Voters ultimately agreed with them. Hawking similarly denounced Brexit, the UK's withdrawal from the European Union (EU). He predicted it would weaken the UK's contribution to global scientific efforts; he claimed modern scientific research requires international collaboration, and that freedom of movement within Europe, as is guaranteed to EU citizens, encourages the spread of ideas. Voters decided in favour of withdrawal in a 2016 referendum. Later that year, as pro-Brexit Prime Minister Theresa May honoured Hawking at the Pride of Britain Awards, he told her: "please don't ask me to help with Brexit."

Hawking encouraged action to prevent climate change. He feared U.S. president Donald Trump's policies on global warming: "By denying the evidence for climate change, and pulling out of the Paris Agreement, Donald Trump will cause avoidable environmental damage to [Earth], endangering the natural world, for us and our children." Hawking also theorized that climate change could lead Earth "to become like Venus, with a temperature of two hundred and fifty degrees [Celsius], and raining sulphuric acid".

Furthermore, Hawking supported nuclear disarmament and stem cell research. He believed the U.S.' 2003 invasion of Iraq was a war crime. He was also critical of the Israeli government's actions in the Israeli–Palestinian conflict, stating they are "likely to lead to disaster", and once boycotted an academic conference in Israel over the occupation of Palestine. In the 2010s, Hawking accused then-Secretary of State for Health and Social Care Jeremy Hunt of cherry picking evidence to support debased scientific claims.

== Personal life ==
=== Marriages ===
Hawking met his future wife, Jane Wilde, at a party in 1962. The following year, Hawking was diagnosed with motor neurone disease (MND; also known as amyotrophic lateral sclerosis (ALS) or Lou Gehrig's disease). In October 1964, the couple became engaged, while aware of Hawking's new physical limitations and shortened life expectancy. Hawking later recalled: "Before I got motor neuron disease, I was bored with life. But the prospect of an early death made me realize life was really worth living." The two were married on 14 July 1965 in their shared hometown of St Albans.

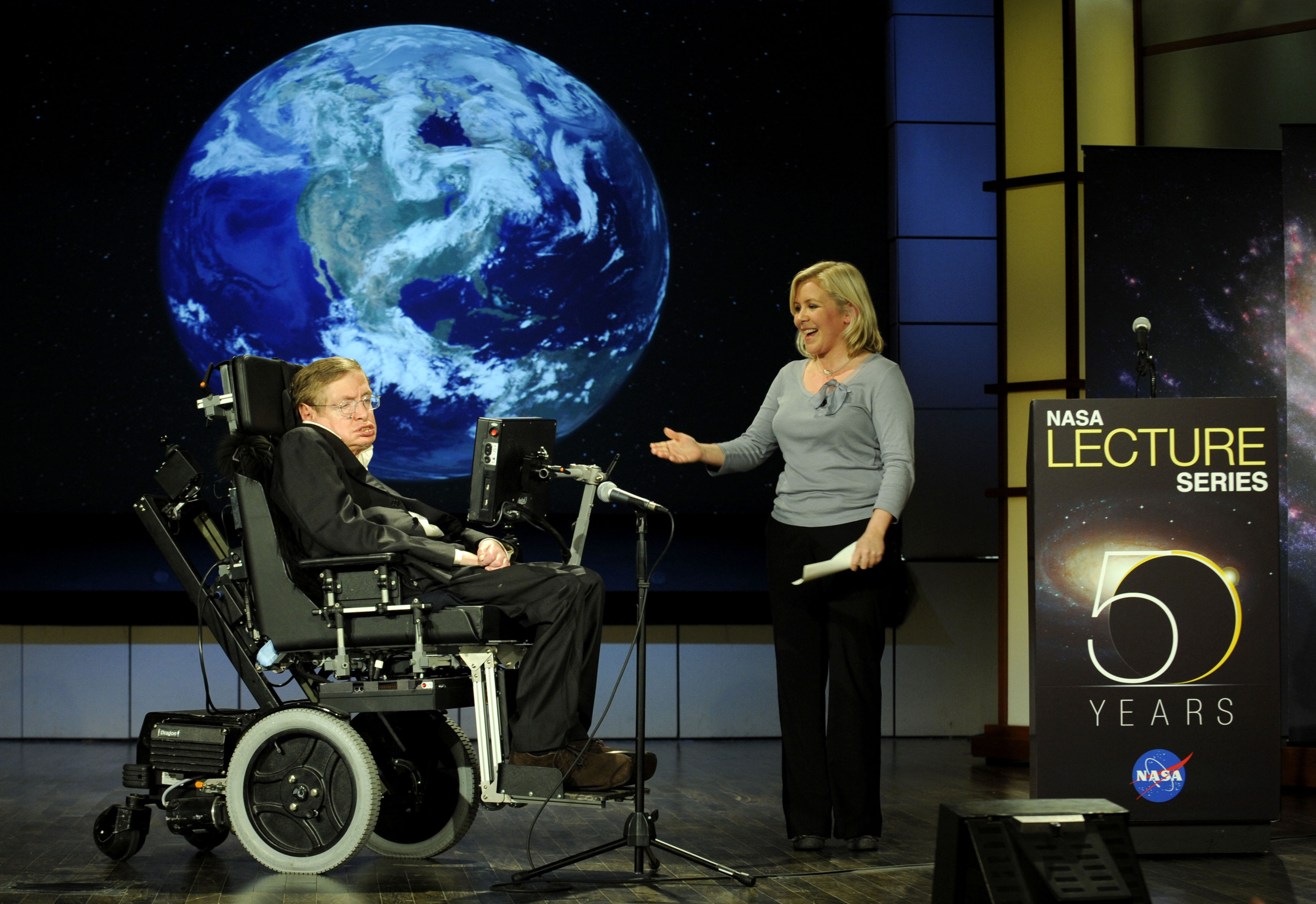
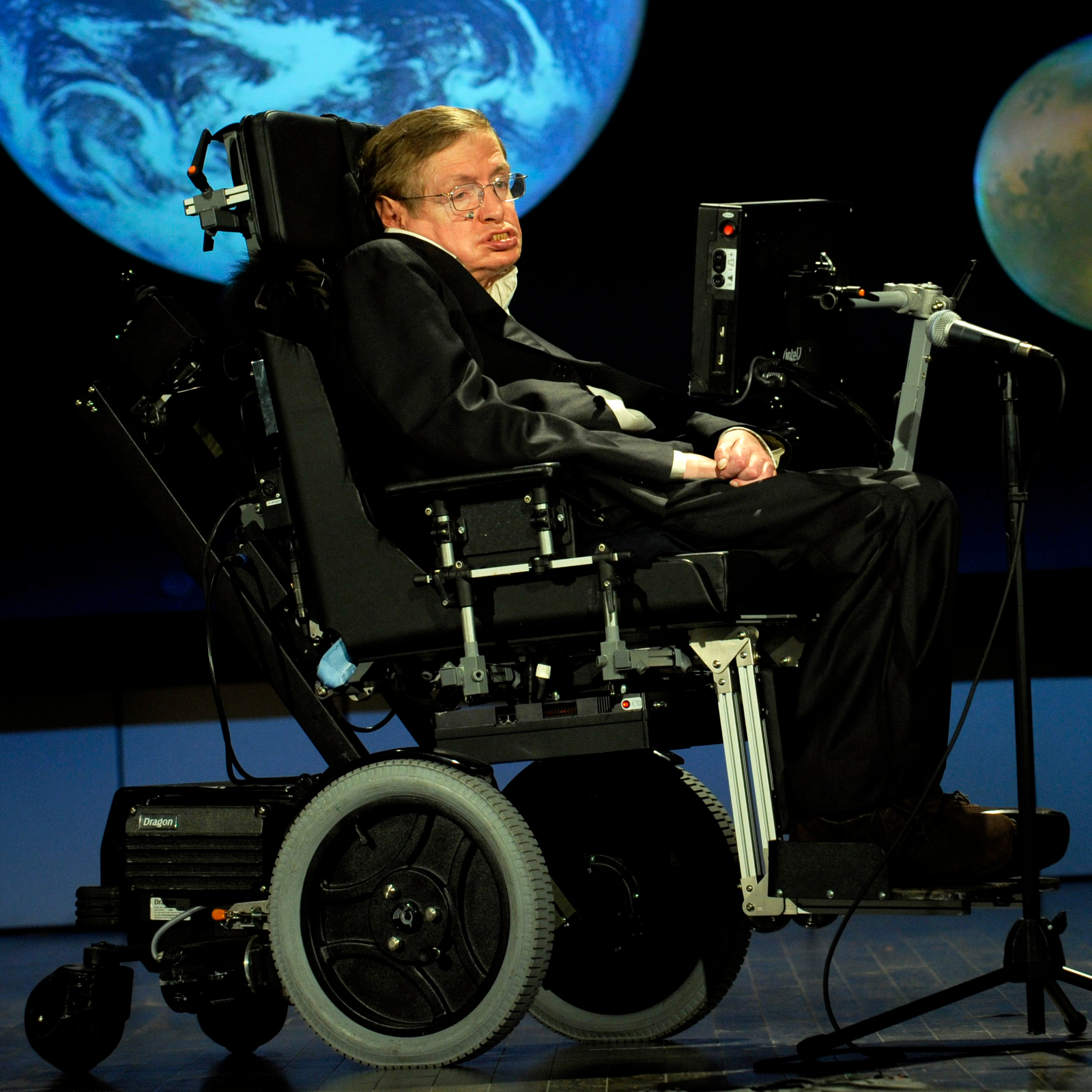
Hawking being presented by his daughter Lucy Hawking at the lecture he gave for NASA's 50th anniversary, 2008

The couple resided in Cambridge, within Hawking's walking distance to the Department of Applied Mathematics and Theoretical Physics (DAMTP). During their first years of marriage, Jane lived in London during the week as she completed her degree at Westfield College. They travelled to the United States several times for conferences and physics-related visits. Jane began a PhD programme through Westfield College in medieval Spanish poetry (completed in 1981). The couple had three children: Robert, born May 1967, Lucy, born November 1970, and Timothy, born April 1979.

Hawking rarely discussed his illness and physical challenges—even, in a precedent set during their courtship, with Jane. His disabilities meant that the responsibilities of home and family rested firmly on his wife's shoulders, leaving him more time to think about physics. Upon his appointment in 1974 to a year-long position at Caltech, Jane proposed that a graduate or post-doctoral student live with them and help with his care. Hawking accepted, and Bernard Carr travelled with them as the first of many students who fulfilled this role. The family spent a generally happy and stimulating year in Pasadena.

Hawking returned to Cambridge in 1975 to a new home and a new job, as reader. Don Page, with whom Hawking had begun a close friendship at Caltech, arrived to work as the live-in graduate student assistant. With Page's help and that of a secretary, Jane's responsibilities were reduced so she could return to her doctoral thesis and her new interest in singing.

Around December 1977, Jane met organist Jonathan Hellyer Jones when singing in a church choir. Hellyer Jones became close to the Hawking family, and by the mid-1980s, he and Jane developed romantic feelings for each other. According to Jane, her husband was accepting of the situation, stating "he would not object so long as I continued to love him". Jane and Hellyer Jones were determined not to break up the family, and their relationship remained platonic for a long period.

By the 1980s, Hawking's marriage had been strained for many years. Jane felt overwhelmed by the intrusion into their family life of the required nurses and assistants. The impact of his celebrity status was challenging for colleagues and family members, while the prospect of living up to a worldwide fairytale image was daunting for the couple. Hawking's views of religion also contrasted with her strong Christian faith and resulted in tension. After a tracheotomy in 1985, Hawking required a full-time nurse and nursing care was split across three shifts daily. In the late 1980s, Hawking grew close to one of his nurses, Elaine Mason, to the dismay of some colleagues, caregivers, and family members, who were disturbed by her strength of personality and protectiveness. In February 1990, Hawking told Jane that he was leaving her for Mason and departed the family home. After his divorce from Jane in 1995, Hawking married Mason in September.

In 1999, Jane published a memoir, Music to Move the Stars, about her marriage and its breakdown. Its revelations caused a sensation in the media but, as was his usual practice regarding his personal life, Hawking made no public comment except to say that he did not read biographies about himself. After his second marriage, Hawking's family felt excluded and marginalised from his life. For a period of about five years in the early 2000s, his family and staff became increasingly worried that he was being physically abused. Police investigations took place, but were closed as Hawking refused to make a complaint.

In 2006, Hawking and Mason quietly divorced, and Hawking resumed closer relationships with Jane, his children, and his grandchildren. Reflecting on this happier period, a revised version of Jane's book, re-titled Travelling to Infinity: My Life with Stephen, was published in 2007, and was made into a film, The Theory of Everything, in 2014.

=== Disability ===
Hawking had a rare early-onset, slow-progressing form of MND, which gradually paralysed him over decades. During his final year at Oxford, he had experienced increasing clumsiness, including a fall on some stairs and difficulties when rowing. The problems worsened, and his speech became slightly slurred. His family noticed the changes when he returned home for Christmas, and medical investigations were begun. He was diagnosed with MND at age 21, in 1963; doctors gave him a life expectancy of two years.

In the late 1960s, Hawking's physical abilities declined: he began to use crutches and could no longer give lectures regularly. As he slowly lost the ability to write, he developed compensatory visual methods, including seeing equations in terms of geometry. Werner Israel later compared the achievements to Mozart composing an entire symphony in his head. Hawking was unwilling to accept help or make concessions for his disabilities. He preferred to be regarded as "a scientist first, popular science writer second, and, in all the ways that matter, a normal human being with the same desires, drives, dreams, and ambitions as the next person". Jane Hawking later noted: "Some people would call it determination, some obstinacy. I've called it both at one time or another." He required much persuasion to accept the use of a wheelchair at the end of the 1960s, but ultimately became notorious for the wildness of his wheelchair driving. Hawking was popular among his colleagues, but his illness, as well as his reputation for brashness, distanced him from some.

When Hawking first began using a wheelchair he was using standard motorised models, or "powerchairs". The earliest surviving example of these chairs was made by BEC Mobility and sold by Christie's in November 2018 for £296,750. Hawking continued to use this type of chair until the early 1990s, at which time his ability to use his hands to drive a wheelchair deteriorated. Hawking used a variety of different chairs from that time, including a DragonMobility Dragon elevating powerchair from 2007; a Permobil C350 from 2014; and then a Permobil F3 from 2016.

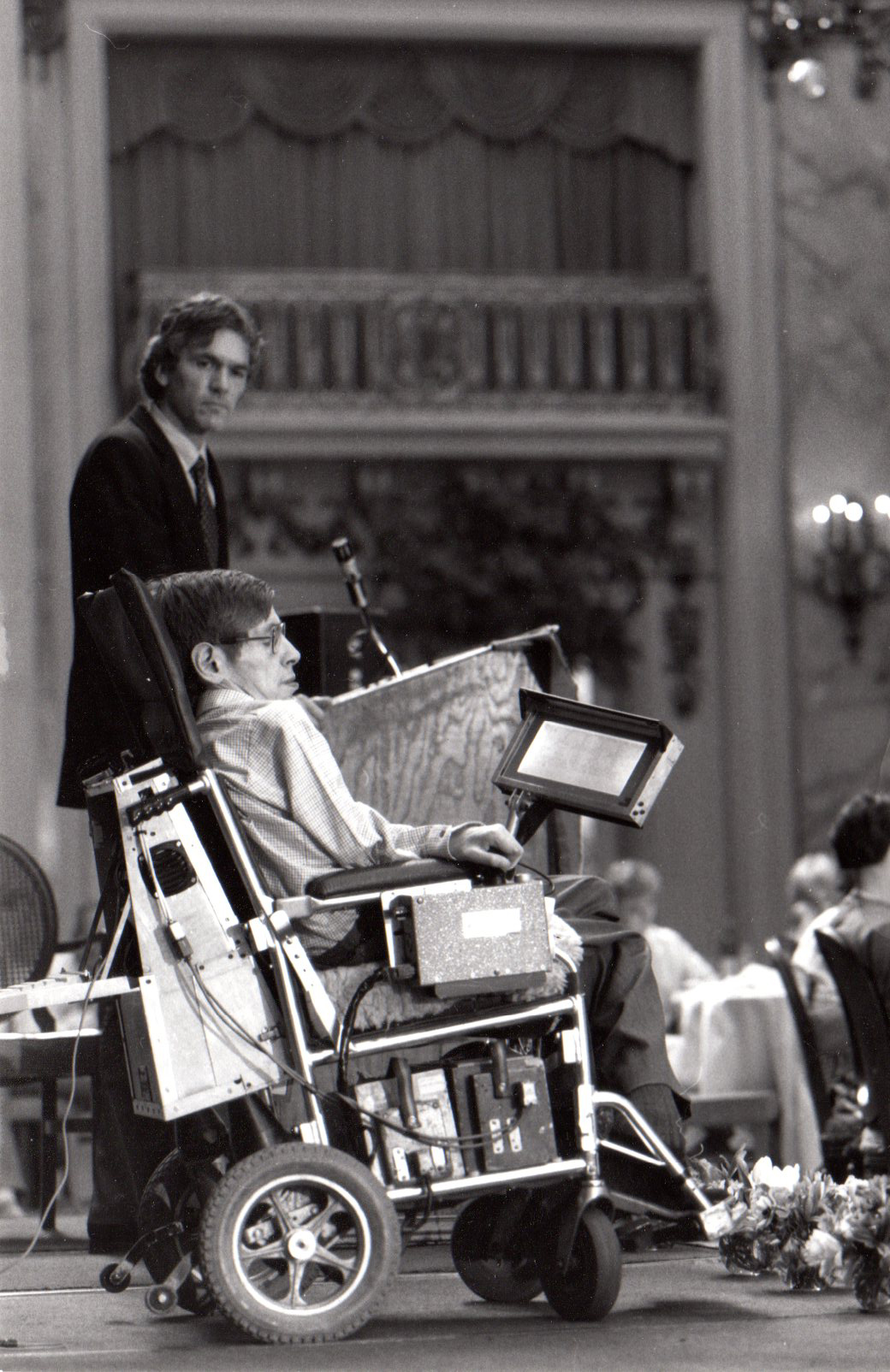
Hawking at an ALS convention in San Francisco in the 1980s

Hawking's speech deteriorated, and by the late 1970s he could be understood by only his family and closest friends. To communicate with others, someone who knew him well would interpret his speech into intelligible speech. Spurred by a dispute with the university over who would pay for the ramp needed for him to enter his workplace, Hawking and his wife campaigned for improved access and support for those with disabilities in Cambridge, including adapted student housing at the university. In general, Hawking had ambivalent feelings about his role as a disability rights champion: while wanting to help others, he also sought to detach himself from his illness and its challenges. His lack of engagement in this area led to some critics saying he was not doing enough, although White and Gribbin noted: "just by staying alive and continuing to work at the intense rate he and the world have grown used to, he is an inspiration to handicapped people everywhere".

During a visit to CERN on the border of France and Switzerland in mid-1985, Hawking contracted pneumonia, which in his condition was life-threatening; he was so ill that Jane was asked if life support should be terminated. She refused, but the consequence was a tracheotomy, which required round-the-clock nursing care and caused the loss of what remained of his speech. The NHS was ready to pay for a nursing home, but Jane was determined that he would live at home. The cost of the care was funded by an American foundation. Nurses were hired for the three shifts required to provide the round-the-clock support he required. One of those employed was Elaine Mason, who was to become Hawking's second wife.

For his communication, Hawking initially raised his eyebrows to choose letters on a spelling card, but in 1986 he received a computer program called the "Equalizer" from Walter Woltosz, CEO of Words Plus, who had developed an earlier version of the software to help his mother-in-law, who also had ALS and had lost her ability to speak and write. In a method he used for the rest of his life, Hawking could now simply press a switch to select phrases, words or letters from a bank of about 2,500–3,000 that were scanned. The program was originally run on a desktop computer. Elaine Mason's husband, David, a computer engineer, adapted a small computer and attached it to his wheelchair.

Released from the need to use somebody to interpret his speech, Hawking commented that "I can communicate better now than before I lost my voice." The voice he used had an American accent and is no longer produced. Despite the later availability of other voices, Hawking retained this original voice, saying that he preferred it and identified with it. Originally, Hawking activated a switch using his hand and could produce up to 15 words per minute. Lectures were prepared in advance and were sent to the speech synthesiser in short sections to be delivered.

Hawking gradually lost the use of his hand, and in 2005 he began to control his communication device with movements of his cheek muscles, with a rate of about one word per minute. With this decline there was a risk of him developing locked-in syndrome, so Hawking worked with Intel researchers on systems that could translate his brain patterns or facial expressions into switch activations. After several prototypes did not perform as planned, they settled on an adaptive word predictor made by the London-based startup SwiftKey, which used a system similar to his original technology. Hawking had an easier time adapting to the new system, which was further developed after inputting large amounts of Hawking's papers and other written materials and uses predictive software similar to other smartphone keyboards.

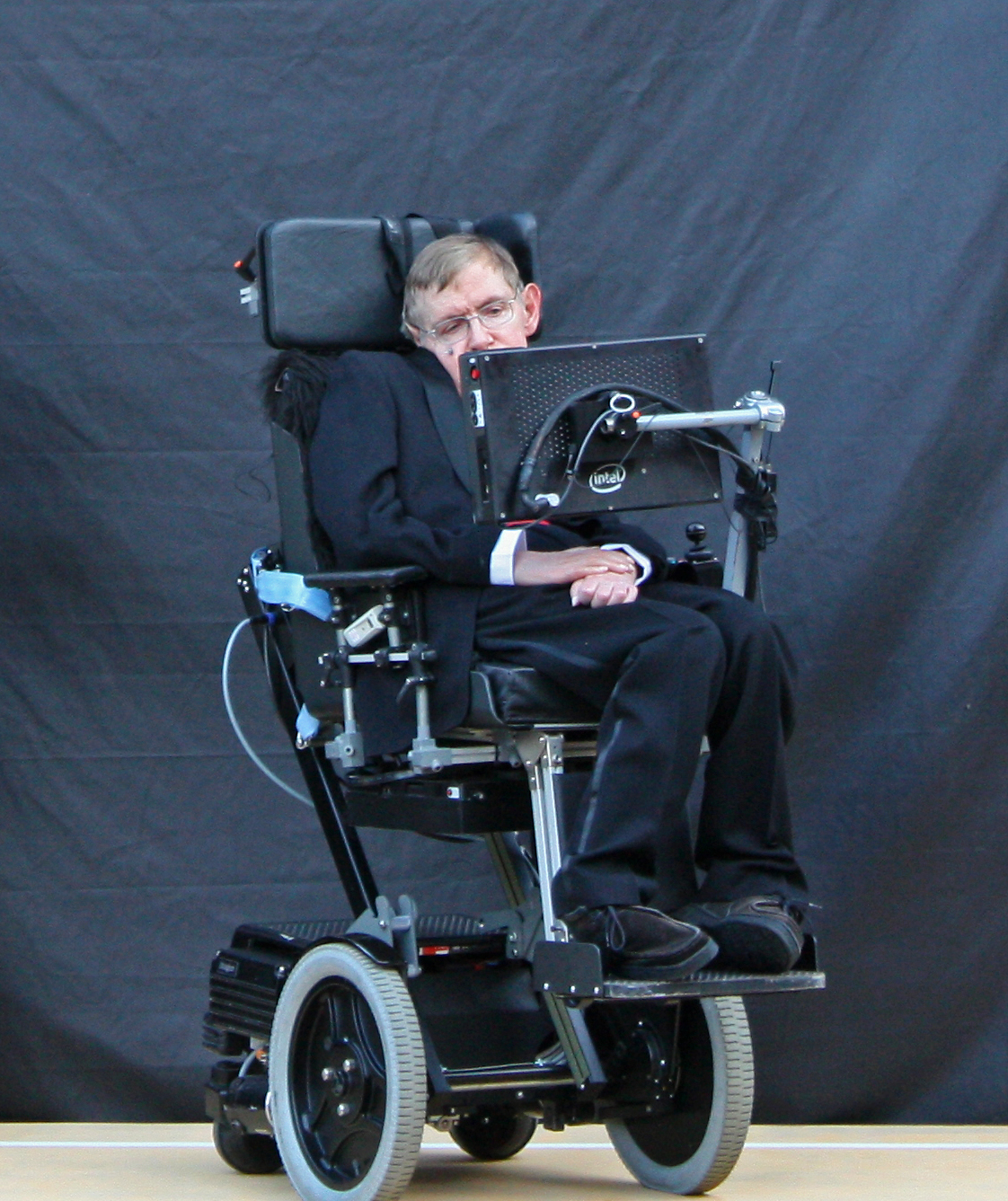
Hawking in 2008

By 2009, he could no longer drive his wheelchair independently, but the same people who created his new typing mechanics were working on a method to drive his chair using movements made by his chin. This proved difficult, since Hawking could not move his neck, and trials showed that while he could indeed drive the chair, the movement was sporadic and jumpy. Near the end of his life, Hawking experienced increased breathing difficulties, often resulting in his requiring the usage of a ventilator, and being regularly hospitalised.

Hawking continued to travel widely, including trips to Chile, Easter Island, South Africa, Spain (to receive the Fonseca Prize in 2008), Canada, and numerous trips to the U.S. For practical reasons related to his disability, Hawking increasingly travelled by private jet, and by 2011, that had become his only mode of international travel.

==== Disability outreach ====
Starting in the 1990s, Hawking accepted the mantle of role model for disabled people, lecturing and participating in fundraising activities. At the turn of the century, he and eleven other humanitarians signed the Charter for the Third Millennium on Disability, which called on governments to prevent disability and protect the rights of disabled people. In 1999, Hawking was awarded the Julius Edgar Lilienfeld Prize of the American Physical Society.

In August 2012, Hawking narrated part of the opening ceremony of the 2012 Summer Paralympics in London. In September 2013, he expressed support for the legalisation of assisted suicide for the terminally ill. In August 2014, Hawking was given the Ice Bucket Challenge—in which someone pours a bucket of ice water over their head on video, before challenging someone else—to promote ALS/MND awareness and research funding; as he had pneumonia in 2013, he did not have ice poured over him, but his children accepted the challenge on his behalf.

=== Plans for a trip to space ===
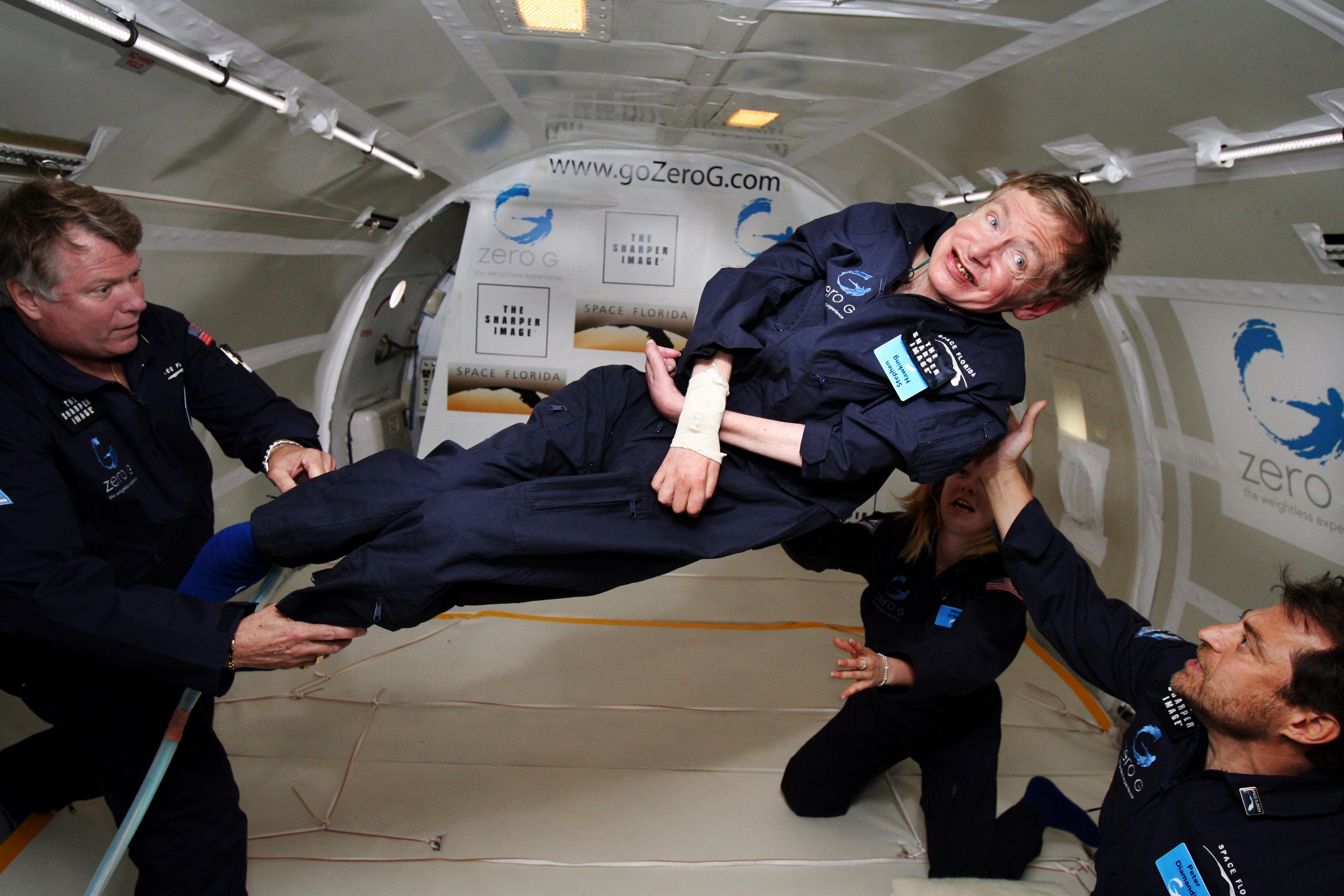
Hawking taking a zero-gravity flight in a reduced-gravity aircraft, April 2007

In late 2006, Hawking stated that one of his greatest unfulfilled desires was to travel to space. On hearing this, Richard Branson offered a free flight into space with Virgin Galactic, which Hawking immediately accepted. Besides personal ambition, he was motivated by the desire to increase public interest in spaceflight and to show the potential of people with disabilities. On 26 April 2007, Hawking flew aboard a specially-modified Boeing 727-200 jet operated by Zero-G Corp off the coast of Florida to experience weightlessness. Fears that the manoeuvres would cause him undue discomfort proved incorrect, and the flight was extended to eight parabolic arcs. It was described as a successful test to see if he could withstand the g-forces involved in spaceflight. At the time, the date of Hawking's trip to space was projected to be as early as 2009, but commercial flights to space did not commence before his death.

=== Mention in Jeffrey Epstein email ===
Hawking was mentioned in court documents released in 2024 as part of the trial of Ghislaine Maxwell, a British child sex trafficker who conspired with American financier Jeffrey Epstein, who died in 2019; in 2015, Epstein had sent an email to friends of Virginia Giuffre, Epstein's alleged victim, asking them to disprove supposed allegations of Giuffre's that Hawking participated in an "underage orgy" in the U.S. Virgin Islands, where Epstein lived. Epstein said he "can issue a reward” to them if they can "prove her allegations are false". The email implies it was written in response to a "new version" of the claim regarding Hawking. Neither Giuffre, who died in 2025, nor anyone else has ever publicly accused Hawking of sexual misconduct. According to physicist Lisa Randall—who was found in 2026 to have corresponded with Epstein—in 2006, Hawking and Epstein were both present at a conference on gravity. Randall describes both her correspondence and Epstein's appearance at the conference as resulting from Epstein's public financing of scientific efforts.

== Death ==
Hawking died at his home in Cambridge on 14 March 2018, at the age of 76. His family stated that he "died peacefully". He was eulogised by figures in science, entertainment, politics, and other fields. (Note: Attributed to multiple references:) The flag of Gonville and Caius College flew at half-mast, and a book of condolences was signed by students and visitors there. On 18 March, at the closing ceremony of the 2018 Winter Paralympics in South Korea, International Paralympic Committee president Andrew Parsons gave a tribute to Hawking.

His private funeral took place on 31 March, at Great St Mary's Church in Cambridge. The guests included actors Eddie Redmayne and Felicity Jones, who played Stephen and Jane Hawking in The Theory of Everything; Queen guitarist and astrophysicist Brian May, and actress and model Lily Cole, Stephen's friend. In addition, actor Benedict Cumberbatch, who played Hawking in the film Hawking (2004), astronaut Tim Peake, astrophysicist and Astronomer Royal Martin Rees, and astrophysicist Kip Thorne provided readings. Although Hawking was an atheist, the funeral took place with a traditional Anglican service.

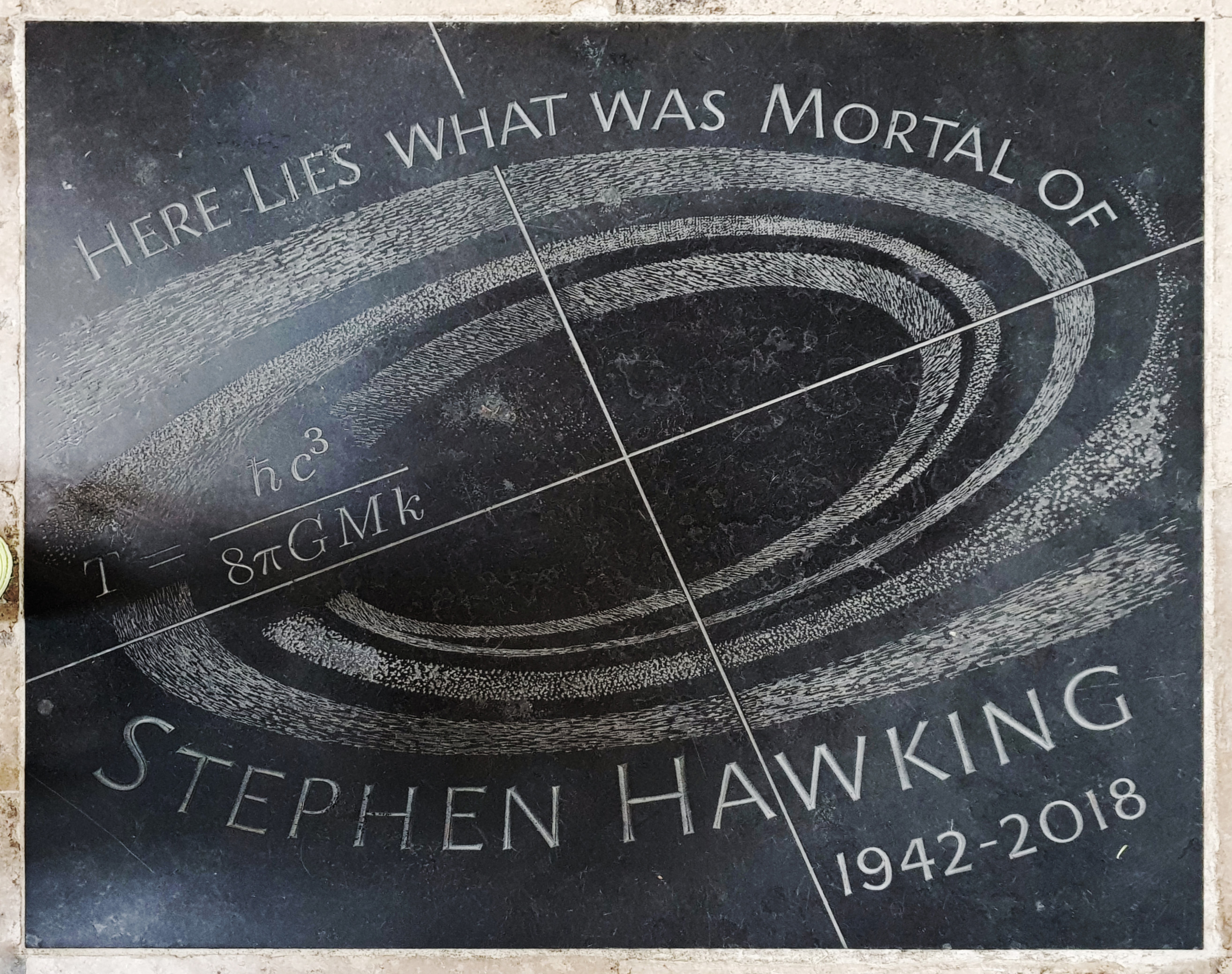
Stephen Hawking's memorial stone in Westminster Abbey

Following the cremation, a service of thanksgiving was held at Westminster Abbey on 15 June 2018, after which his ashes were interred in the Abbey's nave, between the graves of scientists Isaac Newton and Charles Darwin. (Note: Attributed to multiple references:) Inscribed on his memorial stone are the words: "Here lies what was mortal of Stephen Hawking 1942–2018" and an equation describing the temperature of Hawking radiation emitted by black holes. (Note: By considering the effect of a black hole's event horizon on virtual particle production, Hawking found in 1974, much to his surprise, that black holes emit black-body radiation associated with a temperature that can be expressed (in the nonspinning case) as: $$T = \frac{\hbar c^3}{8 \pi G M k},$$ where $T$ is black hole temperature, $\hbar$ is the reduced Planck constant, $c$ is the speed of light, $G$ is the Newtonian constant of gravitation, $M$ is the mass of the black hole, and $k$ is the Boltzmann constant. This relationship between concepts from the disparate fields of general relativity, quantum mechanics and thermodynamics implies the existence of deep connections between them and may presage their unification. It is inscribed on Hawking's memorial stone. The equation's most fundamental implication can be obtained as follows. According to thermodynamics, this temperature is associated with an entropy, $S$, such that $T = M c^2/2 S,$ where $M c^2$ is the energy of a (nonspinning) black hole as expressed with Einstein's formula. Combining equations then gives: $$S = \frac{4 \pi G M^2 k}{\hbar c}.$$ Now, the radius of a nonspinning black hole is given by $r = \frac{2 G M}{c^2},$ and since its surface area is just $A = 4 \pi r^2,$ $S$ can be expressed in terms of surface area as: $$S_\text{BH} = \frac{k c^3}{4 \hbar G} A,$$ where the subscript BH stands for either "black hole" or "Bekenstein–Hawking". This can be expressed more simply as a proportionality between two dimensionless ratios: $$\frac{S_\text{BH}}{k} = \frac{1}{4} \frac{A}{l_\text{P}^2},$$ where $l_\text{P} = \sqrt{\hbar G / c^3}$ is the Planck length. Jacob Bekenstein had conjectured the proportionality; Hawking confirmed it and established the constant of proportionality at $1/4$. Calculations based on string theory, first carried out in 1995, have been found to yield the same result. This relationship is conjectured to be valid not just for black holes, but also (since entropy is proportional to information) as an upper bound on the amount of information that can be contained in any volume of space, which has in turn spawned deeper reflections on the possible nature of reality.)

He had directed that the equation be his epitaph at least fifteen years before his death.

In June 2018, it was announced that a speech of Hawking's, set to music by composer Vangelis, would be beamed into space from a European Space Agency satellite dish in Spain in the direction of A0620-00, one of the nearest known black holes to Earth.

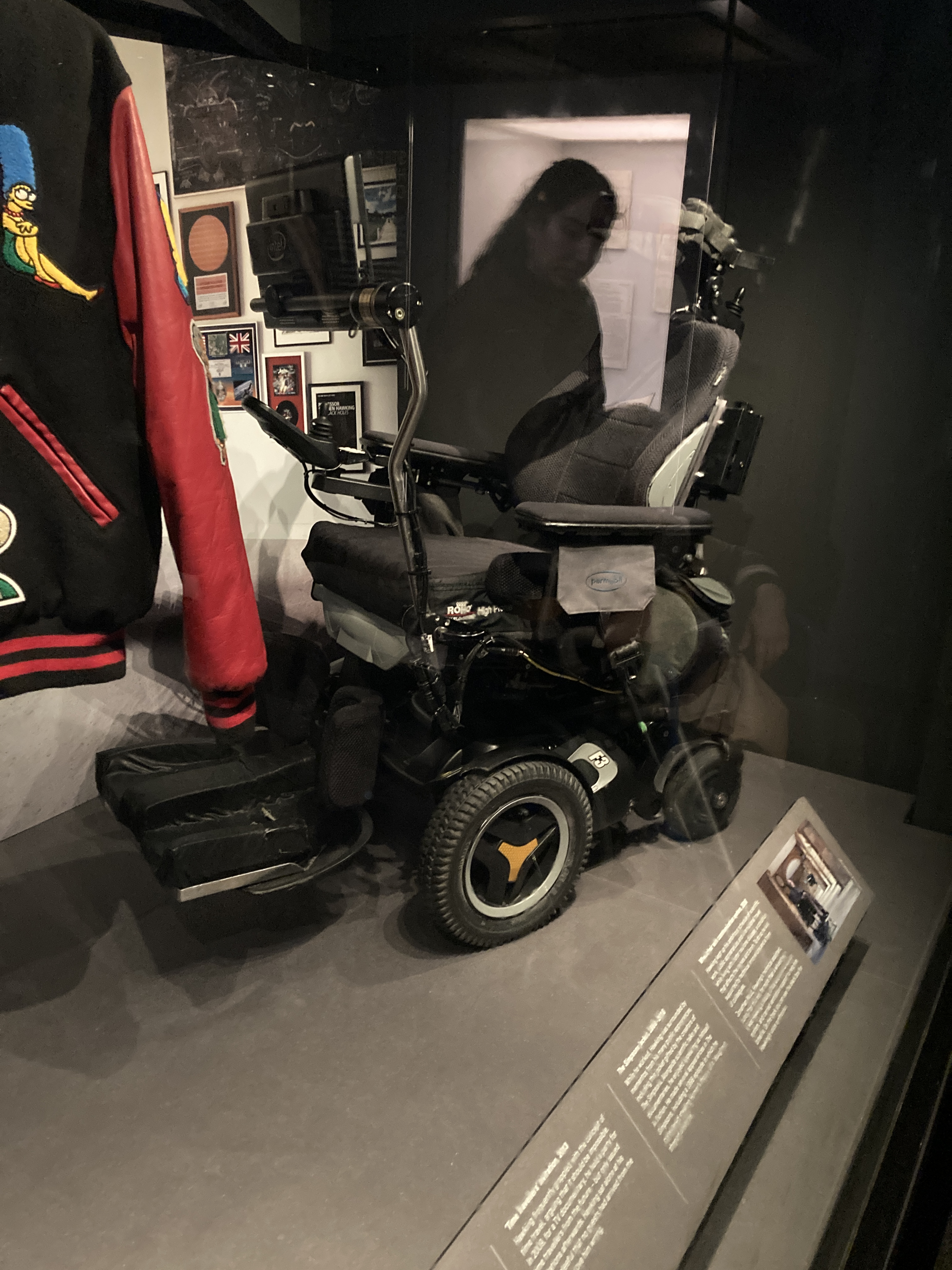
Hawking's wheelchair on display at the Science Museum, London (2022)

On 8 November 2018, an auction of 22 personal possessions of Hawking, including his wheelchair and his document for Properties of Expanding Universes, took place, and fetched about £1.8 million. Proceeds from the auction sale of the wheelchair went to two charities, the Motor Neurone Disease Association and the Stephen Hawking Foundation; proceeds from the other items went to his estate.

In March 2019, it was announced that the Royal Mint would issue a commemorative 50p coin, only available as a commemorative edition, in honour of Hawking. The same month, Hawking's nurse, Patricia Dowdy, was struck off the nursing register for "failures over his care and financial misconduct".

In May 2021, it was announced that an Acceptance-in-Lieu agreement between HM Revenue and Customs, the Department for Culture, Media and Sport, Cambridge University Library, Science Museum Group, and the Hawking Estate, would see around 10,000 pages of Hawking's scientific and other papers remain in Cambridge, while objects including his wheelchairs, speech synthesisers, and personal memorabilia from his former Cambridge office would be housed at the Science Museum in London. In February 2022, the "Stephen Hawking at Work" display opened at the Science Museum as the start of a two-year nationwide tour. In October 2024, the Hawking Building of the Science and Innovation Park in Swindon, England was opened to the public. The building holds about 80% of the Science Museum Group's object collection.

== Media depictions ==
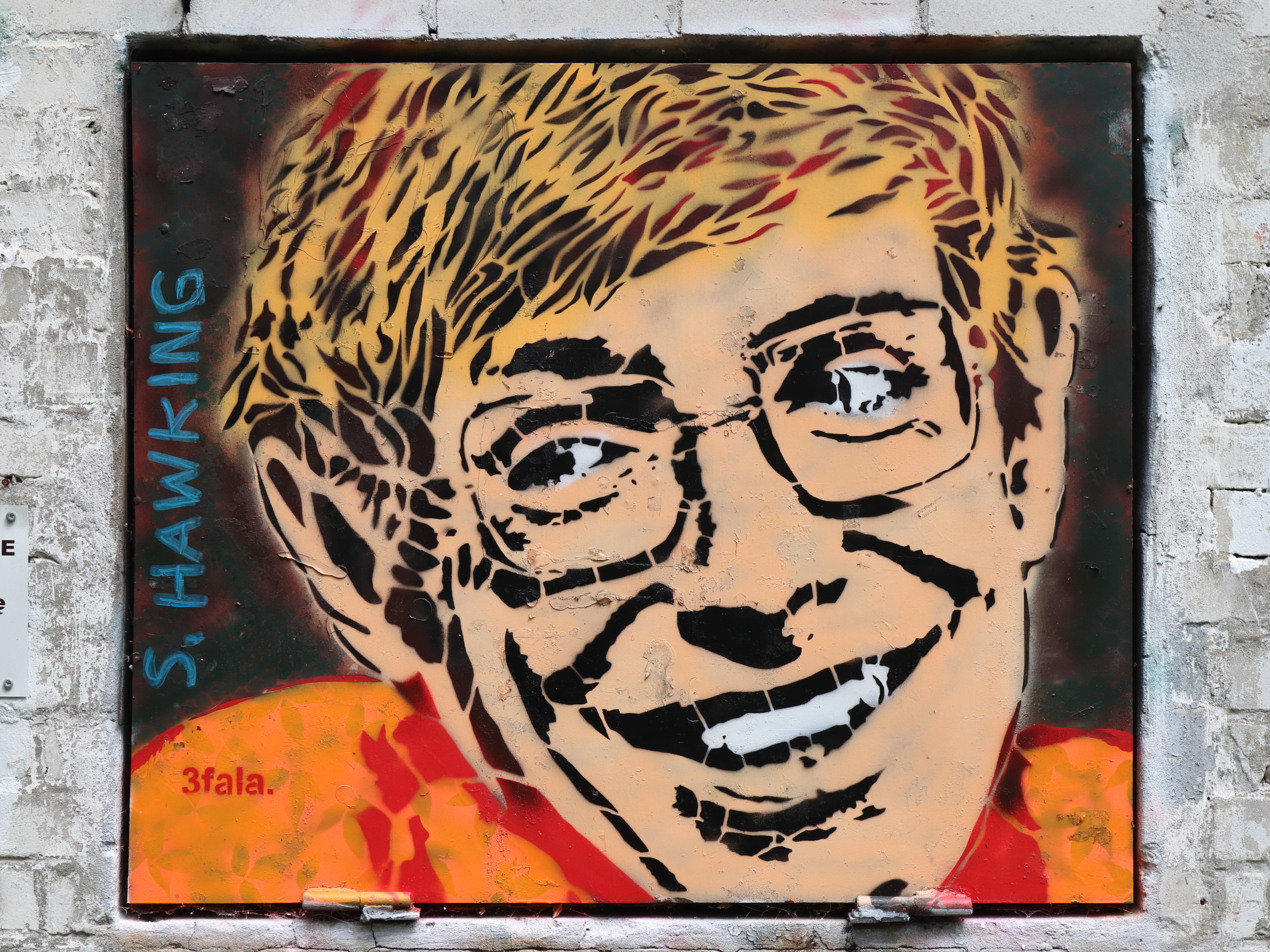
A mural commemorating Stephen Hawking in Warsaw, Poland (2022)

Hawking appeared in multiple documentary films, including God, the Universe and Everything Else (1988), The Real Stephen Hawking (2001), Stephen Hawking: Profile (2002), and Hawking (2013), and the documentary series Stephen Hawking, Master of the Universe (2008).

Appearing on the radio programme Desert Island Discs in 1992, Hawking chose multiple musical works that "[sum] up my life": Mozart's Requiem; The Beatles' "Please Please Me"; Édith Piaf's "Non, je ne regrette rien"; Francis Poulenc's Gloria; Johannes Brahms' Violin Concerto; Ludwig van Beethoven's String Quartet No. 15; Richard Wagner's Die Walküre, Act 1; and "O Principe, che a lunghe carovane", a segment of Giacomo Puccini's opera Turandot. For a book, he chose George Eliot's Middlemarch.

In 1993, Hawking's synthesiser voice was recorded for use in the Pink Floyd song "Keep Talking", and in 1999, it was recorded for an episode of The Simpsons. Hawking copyrighted the voice, and allowed it to be used in The Theory of Everything, in which he was portrayed by Eddie Redmayne in an Academy Award-winning role.

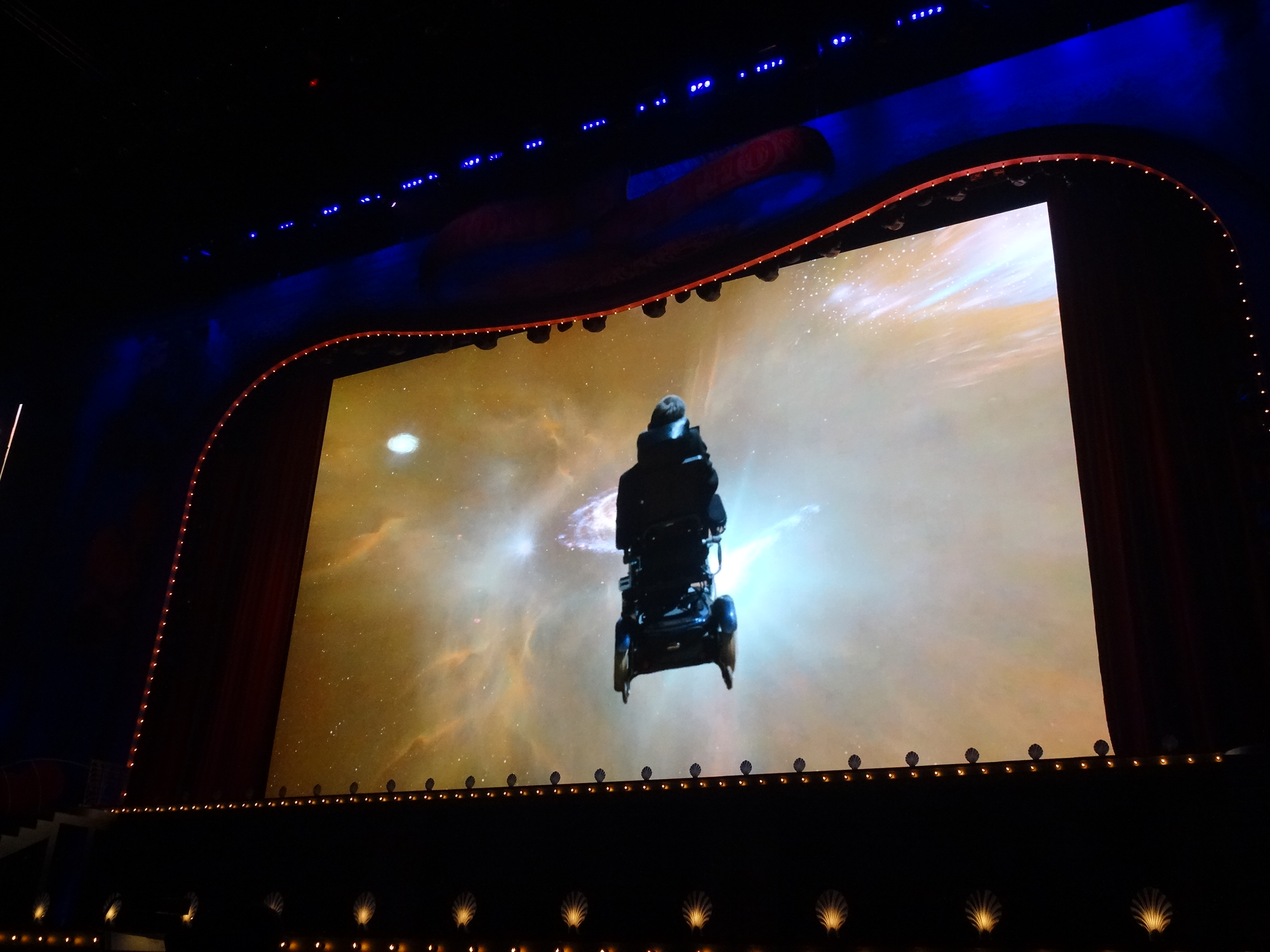
Hawking in Monty Python's "Galaxy Song" video at the comedy troupe's 2014 reunion show, Monty Python Live (Mostly)

Hawking played a holographic simulation of himself in an episode of Star Trek: The Next Generation in 1993. Hawking also guest-starred in the sitcoms Futurama and The Big Bang Theory. Broadcast in March 2018, before his death, Hawking was the voice of The Book Mark II on The Hitchhiker's Guide to the Galaxy radio series, and he was a guest of Neil deGrasse Tyson on StarTalk. Hawking was featured at the Monty Python Live (Mostly) show in 2014, shown in a pre-recorded video singing Monty Python's "Galaxy Song" and Brian Cox with his wheelchair.

Hawking advertised multiple products, including a wheelchair brand, National Savings, British Telecom, Specsavers, Egg Banking, and Go Compare. In 2015, he applied to trademark his name.

In 2022, Google featured Hawking in a Google Doodle on the occasion of his 80th birthday.

== Awards and honours ==
Hawking received numerous awards and honours. Already early in the list, in 1974 he was elected a Fellow of the Royal Society (FRS). At that time, his nomination read:

Hawking has made major contributions to the field of general relativity. These derive from a deep understanding of what is relevant to physics and astronomy, and especially from a mastery of wholly new mathematical techniques. Following the pioneering work of Penrose he established, partly alone and partly in collaboration with Penrose, a series of successively stronger theorems establishing the fundamental result that all realistic cosmological models must possess singularities. Using similar techniques, Hawking has proved the basic theorems on the laws governing black holes: that stationary solutions of Einstein's equations with smooth event horizons must necessarily be axisymmetric; and that in the evolution and interaction of black holes, the total surface area of the event horizons must increase. In collaboration with G. Ellis, Hawking is the author of an impressive and original treatise on "Space-time in the Large".

The citation continues, "Other important work by Hawking relates to the interpretation of cosmological observations and to the design of gravitational wave detectors."

Hawking was also a member of the American Academy of Arts and Sciences (1984), the American Philosophical Society (1984), and the U.S. National Academy of Sciences (1992). He was awarded Honorary membership in 1992, of the Manchester Literary and Philosophical Society. In the 1989 Birthday Honours, he was appointed a Member of the Order of the Companions of Honour (CH).

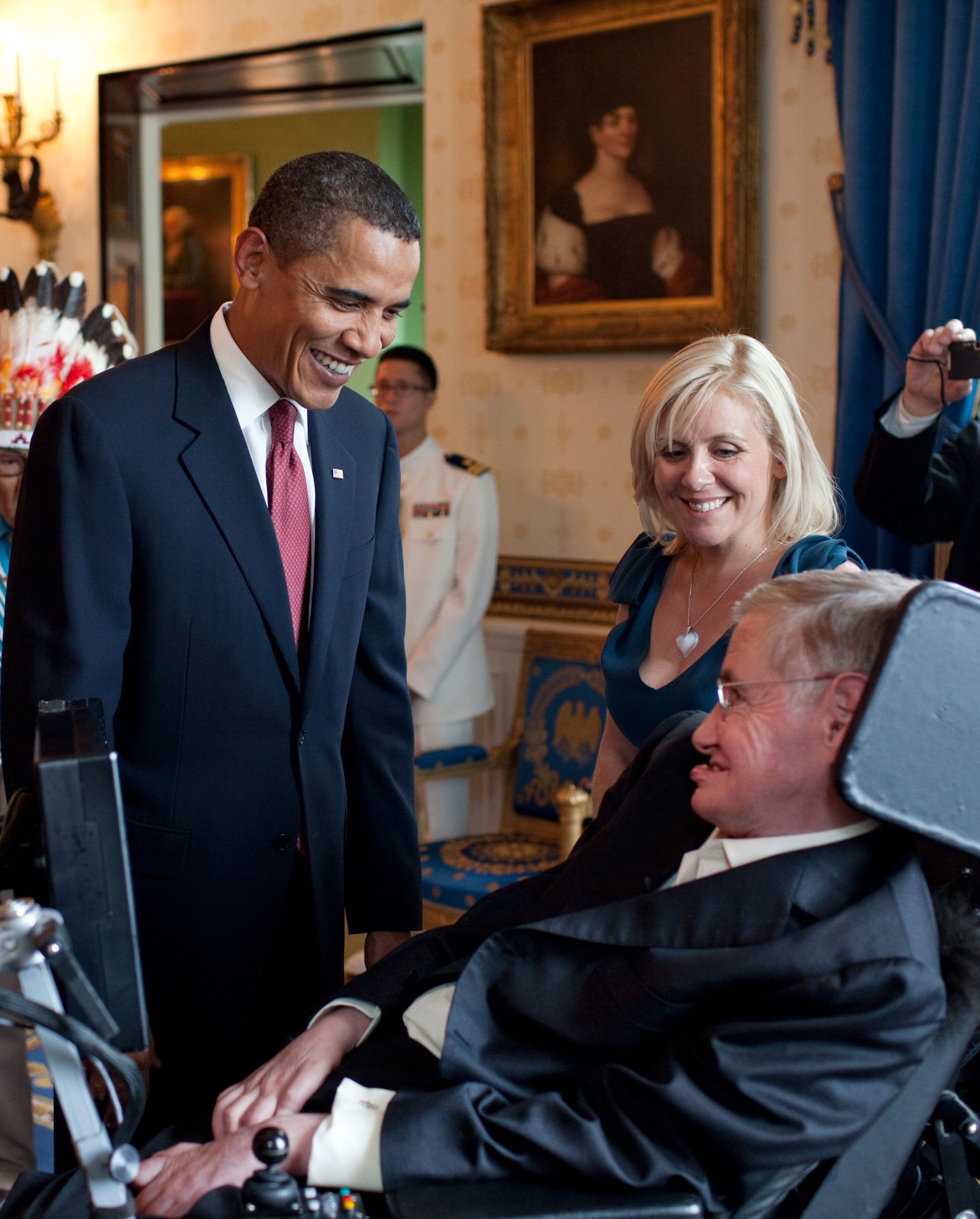
U.S. president Barack Obama and Hawking in the White House in 2009, when Hawking received the Presidential Medal of Freedom

In 1981, Hawking was awarded the American Franklin Medal, and in the 1982 New Year Honours, appointed a Commander of the Order of the British Empire (CBE). He then received five more honorary degrees, the Gold Medal of the Royal Astronomical Society (1985), the Paul Dirac Medal (1987) and, jointly with Penrose, the prestigious Wolf Prize (1988). In 1986, he was appointed an Academician at the Pontifical Academy of Sciences. He reportedly declined a knighthood in the late 1990s in objection to the UK's science funding policy. In 2002, following a UK-wide vote, the BBC included Hawking in their list of the 100 Greatest Britons. He was awarded the Copley Medal from the Royal Society (2006), the Presidential Medal of Freedom, which is America's highest civilian honour (2009), and the Russian Special Fundamental Physics Prize (2013).

Several buildings have been named after him, including the Stephen W. Hawking Science Museum in San Salvador, El Salvador, the Stephen Hawking Building in Cambridge, and the Stephen Hawking Centre at the Perimeter Institute in Canada. Given Hawking's association with time, he unveiled the mechanical "Chronophage" (or time-eating) Corpus Clock at Corpus Christi College, Cambridge in September 2008. In July 2017, Hawking was awarded an Honorary Doctorate from Imperial College London.

Hawking received the 2015 BBVA Foundation Frontiers of Knowledge Award in Basic Sciences shared with Viatcheslav Mukhanov for discovering that the galaxies were formed from quantum fluctuations in the early Universe. At the 2016 Pride of Britain Awards, Hawking received the lifetime achievement award "for his contribution to science and British culture". After receiving the award from Theresa May, Hawking humorously requested that she not seek his help with Brexit.

=== The Hawking Fellowship ===
In 2017, the Cambridge Union Society, in conjunction with Hawking, established the Professor Stephen Hawking Fellowship. The fellowship is awarded annually to an individual who has made an exceptional contribution to the STEM fields and social discourse, with a particular focus on impacts affecting the younger generations. Each fellow delivers a lecture on a topic of their choosing, known as the "Hawking Lecture".

Hawking himself accepted the inaugural fellowship, and he delivered the first Hawking Lecture in his last public appearance before his death.

=== Medal for Science Communication ===
Hawking was a member of the advisory board of the Starmus Festival, and had a major role in acknowledging and promoting science communication. The Stephen Hawking Medal for Science Communication is an annual award initiated in 2016 to honour members of the arts community for contributions that help build awareness of science. Recipients receive a medal bearing a portrait of Hawking by Alexei Leonov, and the other side represents an image of Leonov himself performing the first spacewalk along with an image of the "Red Special", the guitar of Brian May (with music being another major component of the Starmus Festival).

The Starmus III Festival in 2016 was a tribute to Stephen Hawking and the book of all Starmus III lectures, "Beyond the Horizon", was also dedicated to him. The first recipients of the medals, which were awarded at the festival, were chosen by Hawking himself: composer Hans Zimmer, physicist Jim Al-Khalili, and the science documentary film Particle Fever (2013).

== Publications ==
=== Popular books ===
- A Brief History of Time (1988)
- Black Holes and Baby Universes and Other Essays (1993)
- The Universe in a Nutshell (2001)
- On the Shoulders of Giants (2002)
- God Created the Integers: The Mathematical Breakthroughs That Changed History (2005)
- The Dreams That Stuff Is Made of: The Most Astounding Papers of Quantum Physics and How They Shook the Scientific World (2011)
- My Brief History (2013) Hawking's memoir.
- Brief Answers to the Big Questions (2018)

==== Co-authored ====
- The Nature of Space and Time (with Roger Penrose) (1996)
- The Large, the Small and the Human Mind (with Roger Penrose, Abner Shimony and Nancy Cartwright) (1997)
- The Future of Spacetime (with Kip Thorne, Igor Novikov, Timothy Ferris and introduction by Alan Lightman, Richard H. Price) (2002)
- A Briefer History of Time (with Leonard Mlodinow) (2005)
- The Grand Design (with Leonard Mlodinow) (2010)

==== Forewords ====
- Black Holes & Time Warps: Einstein's Outrageous Legacy (Kip Thorne, and introduction by Frederick Seitz) (1994)
- The Physics of Star Trek (Lawrence Krauss) (1995)

=== Children's fiction ===
Co-written with his daughter Lucy.

- George's Secret Key to the Universe (2007)
- George's Cosmic Treasure Hunt (2009)
- George and the Big Bang (2011)
- George and the Unbreakable Code (2014)
- George and the Blue Moon (2016)

=== Films and series ===
- A Brief History of Time (1992)
- Stephen Hawking's Universe (1997)
- Hawking – BBC television film (2004) starring Benedict Cumberbatch
- Horizon: The Hawking Paradox (2005)
- Masters of Science Fiction (2007)
- Stephen Hawking and the Theory of Everything (2007)
- Stephen Hawking: Master of the Universe (2008)
- Into the Universe with Stephen Hawking (2010)
- Brave New World with Stephen Hawking (2011)
- Stephen Hawking's Grand Design (2012)
- The Big Bang Theory (2012, 2014–2015, 2017)
- Stephen Hawking: A Brief History of Mine (2013)
- The Theory of Everything – Feature film (2014) starring Eddie Redmayne
- Genius by Stephen Hawking (2016)

=== Selected academic works ===
- Hawking, Stephen William; Penrose, Roger (1970). "The Singularities of Gravitational Collapse and Cosmology". Proceedings of the Royal Society A. 314 (1519): 529–548. Bibcode:1970RSPSA.314..529H. doi:10.1098/rspa.1970.0021. S2CID 120208756. Zbl 0954.83012. Wikidata Q55872061.
- Hawking, S. W. (1971). "Gravitational Radiation from Colliding Black Holes". Physical Review Letters. 26 (21): 1344–1346. Bibcode:1971PhRvL..26.1344H. doi:10.1103/physrevlett.26.1344. Wikidata Q21706376.
- Hawking, Stephen William (1972). "Black holes in general relativity". Communications in Mathematical Physics. 25 (2): 152–166. Bibcode:1972CMaPh..25..152H. doi:10.1007/bf01877517. S2CID 121527613. Wikidata Q56453197.
- Hawking, Stephen William (1974). "Black hole explosions?". Nature. 248 (5443): 30–31. Bibcode:1974Natur.248...30H. doi:10.1038/248030a0. S2CID 4290107. Zbl 1370.83053. Wikidata Q54017915.
- Hawking, Stephen William (1982). "The development of irregularities in a single bubble inflationary universe". Physics Letters B. 115 (4): 295–297. Bibcode:1982PhLB..115..295H. doi:10.1016/0370-2693(82)90373-2. Wikidata Q29398982.
- Hartle, J. B.; Hawking, S. W. (1983). "Wave function of the Universe". Physical Review D. 28 (12): 2960–2975. Bibcode:1983PhRvD..28.2960H. doi:10.1103/physrevd.28.2960. Zbl 1370.83118. Wikidata Q21707690.
- Hawking, Stephen William; C J Hunter (1996). "The gravitational Hamiltonian in the presence of non-orthogonal boundaries". Classical and Quantum Gravity. 13 (10): 2735–2752. arXiv:gr-qc/9603050. Bibcode:1996CQGra..13.2735H. doi:10.1088/0264-9381/13/10/012. S2CID 10715740. Zbl 0859.58038. Wikidata Q56551504.
- Hawking, S. W. (2005). "Information loss in black holes". Physical Review D. 72 (8). arXiv:hep-th/0507171. Bibcode:2005PhRvD..72h4013H. doi:10.1103/physrevd.72.084013. S2CID 118893360. Wikidata Q21651473.
- Hawking, Stephen William; Hertog, Thomas (2018). "A smooth exit from eternal inflation?". Journal of High Energy Physics. 2018 (4). arXiv:1707.07702. Bibcode:2018JHEP...04..147H. doi:10.1007/jhep04(2018)147. S2CID 13745992. Zbl 1390.83455. Wikidata Q55878494.

== See also ==
- List of people who have declined a British honour
- List of things named after Stephen Hawking
- List of contributors to general relativity
- On the Origin of Time, a book by Thomas Hertog about Hawking's theories
- Timeline of gravitational physics and relativity
