= A Question and Answer Guide to Astronomy =

Book about astronomy

- Front cover of A Question and Answer Guide to Astronomy
- Author: Pierre-Yves Bely, Carol Christian, and Jean-Rene Roy
- Language: English
- Subject: Astronomy
- Genre: Science
- Publisher: Cambridge University Press
- Publication date: March 2010
- Publication place: United States
- Media type: Print (paperback)
- Pages: 294 pages
- ISBN: 978-0-521-18066-5

A Question and Answer Guide to Astronomy is a book about astronomy and cosmology, and is intended for a general audience. The book was written by Pierre-Yves Bely, Carol Christian, and Jean-Rene Roy, and published in English by Cambridge University Press in 2010. It was originally written in French. The content within the book is written using a question and answer format. It contains some 250 questions, which The Science Teacher states each are answered with a "concise and well-formulated essay that is informative and readable." The Science Teacher review goes on to state that many of the answers given in the book are "little gems of science writing". The Science Teacher summarizes by stating that each question is likely to be thought of by a student, and that "the answers are informative, well constructed, and thorough".

The book covers information about the planets, the Earth, the Universe, practical astronomy, history, and awkward questions such as astronomy in the Bible, UFOs, and aliens. Also covered are subjects such as the Big Bang, comprehension of large numbers, and the Moon illusion.

== See also ==
- Bibliography of encyclopedias: astronomy and astronomers
