= The Dreams That Stuff Is Made Of =

Book by Stephen Hawking

The Dreams That Stuff Is Made of: The Most Astounding Papers of Quantum Physics and How They Shook the Scientific World
- Hardcover edition
- Author: Stephen Hawking
- Language: English
- Publisher: Running Press
- Publication date: 2011
- Publication place: United Kingdom
- Media type: Print
- Pages: 1176
- ISBN: 9780762443741
- OCLC: 761646095
- Preceded by: The Grand Design
- Followed by: My Brief History

The Dreams That Stuff Is Made of: The Most Astounding Papers of Quantum Physics and How They Shook the Scientific World is a 2011 book by English physicist Stephen Hawking.

== Overview ==
The book compiles the essential works from the scientists that changed the face of physics, including works by Niels Bohr, Max Planck, Werner Heisenberg, Erwin Schrodinger, J. Robert Oppenheimer, Richard Feynman, and Max Born.
