= A Briefer History of Time (Hawking and Mlodinow book) =

2005 popular science book by Stephen Hawking

- First edition
- Authors: Stephen Hawking, Leonard Mlodinow
- Language: English
- Subject: The Universe
- Published: 2005 (Bantam Books)
- Publication place: United States
- Pages: 176 (paperback)
- ISBN: 0-553-80436-7

A Briefer History of Time is a 2006 popular-science book by the English physicist Stephen Hawking and the American physicist Leonard Mlodinow.

== Overview ==
The book is an update and rewrite of Hawking's 1988 A Brief History of Time. In this book Hawking and Mlodinow present quantum mechanics, string theory, the big bang theory, and other topics in a more accessible fashion to the general public. The book is updated with newly discovered topics, and informs of recurring subjects throughout the book in greater detail.
