= Emirates Airline Festival of Literature =

- Genre: Literary festival
- Locations: Habtoor Palace, Dubai, United Arab Emirates
- Years active: 2009 – present
- Website: www.emirateslitfest.com

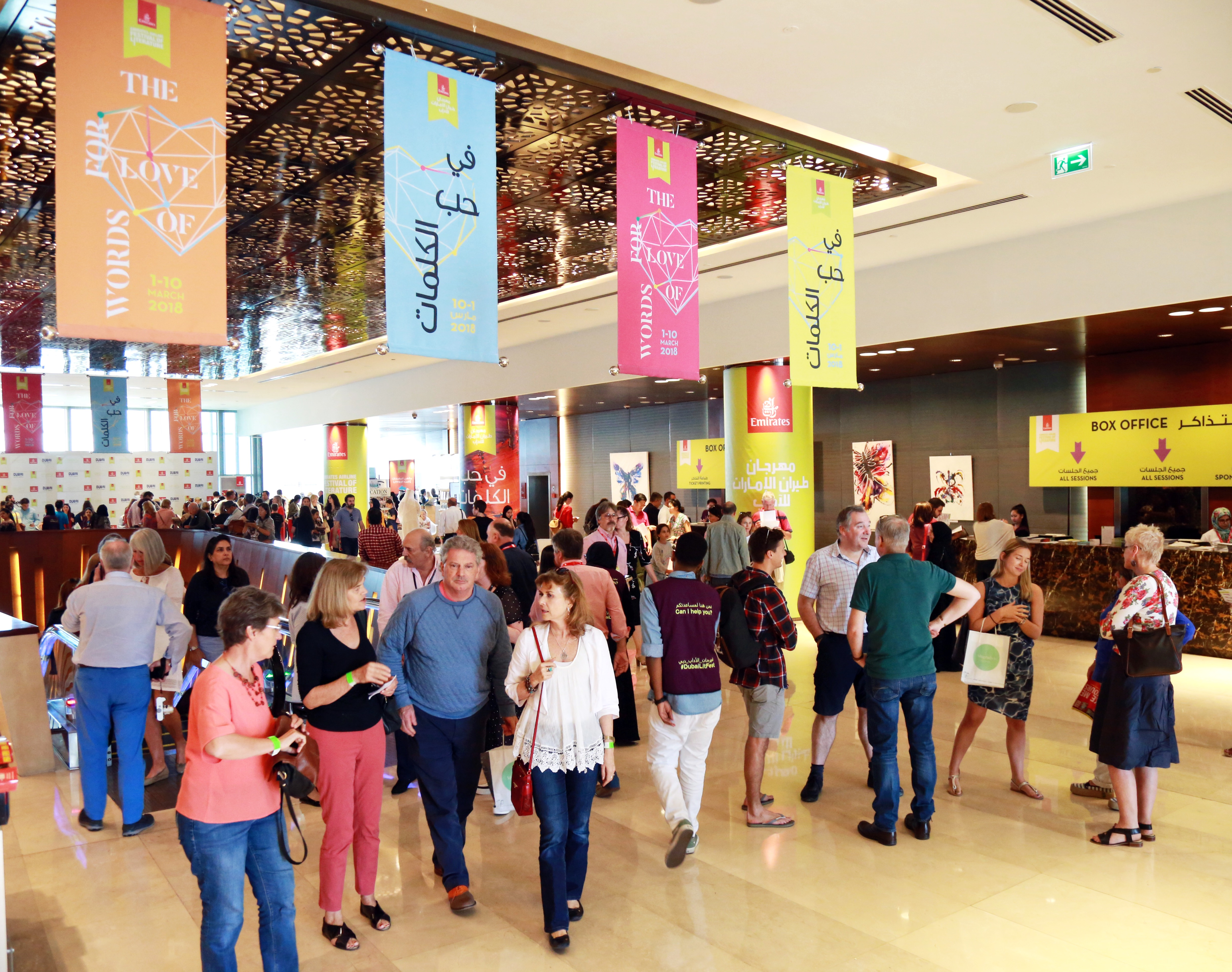
2018 Emirates Airline Festival of Literature.

The Emirates Airline Festival of Literature (The Festival) is an international literature festival held annually in the United Arab Emirates. The festival is held under the patronage of Sheikh Mohammed bin Rashid Al Maktoum, under the auspices of the Emirates Literature Foundation and is run by Ahlam Bolooki. The festival's offices are located within the Dubai International Writers' Centre.

The festival is held each February at the Habtoor Palace, in Dubai, in partnership with Emirates Airline and the Dubai Culture & Arts Authority.

== History ==
In 2009, the Emirates Airline International Festival of Literature was launched with 65 international authors, including Chimamanda Adichie, Simon Armitage, Jung Chang, Imtiaz Dharker, Carol Ann Duffy, Sir Ranulph Fiennes, Nujoom Al-Ghanem, Philippa Gregory, Victoria Hislop, Ibrahim Kuni, Frank McCourt (his final appearance before his death), Mark Tully, among others.

In 2010, the Festival was renamed the Emirates Airline Festival of Literature and its theme was "Debate, Inspire, Enjoy" welcomed over 80 authors, including Leila Aboulela, Martin Amis, Tim Butcher, Polly Dunbar, Maha Gargash, Abdo Khal, Yann Martel, Alexander McCall Smith, Mariam Al Saedi, Marjane Satrapi, Qais Sedki, Vikas Swarup and Dame Jacqueline Wilson.

In 2011, the festival was themed "Face to Face" and about 120 authors were invited for the third Festival with a larger Arabic focus this time. Some of the attending authors were Mohammed Achaari, Kate Adie, Margaret Atwood, Aminatta Forna, Joumana Haddad, Madhur Jaffrey, Yang Lian, Michael Morpurgo, Michael Palin, Lionel Shriver, and Wole Soyinka, the Nobel Prize for Literature winner.

In 2012, The Festival offered a more diversified program, that focused on "Identity", by inviting authors, poets, celebrity chefs and publishers, such as John Agard, David Almond, Chetan Bhagat, Luigi Bonomi, Tim Bowler, Bobby Chinn, Ranjit Hoskote, Daljit Nagra, Alastair Reynolds, Darren Shan, and Sir Terry Wogan.

"Heroes and Villains" was the Festival's theme for 2013. Five special evening activities were planned to celebrate the festival's fifth anniversary. They included a grand opening ceremony, Desert Stanzas, a night of poetry in the desert, and the Murder Mystery Dinner, where international authors aided guests to solve a 'murder'. Among the attendees were Jeffrey Archer, Ken Hom, Anupam Kher, Nik Gowing, Anthony Horowitz, Shobhaa De, Jeffery Deaver, Lynda La Plante, Ian Rankin, Dan Rather, and Tan Twan Eng. The Festival also welcomed Royal guests, such as Sheikh Mohammed bin Rashid Al Maktoum, who attended Desert Stanzas, Sheikh Mansoor bin Mohammed bin Rashid Al Maktoum, and Sheikha Bodour Bint Sultan Al Qasimi.

In 2014, the festival was themed "Metamorphosis", there were about 169 attending authors in the sixth Festival, which was also the Festival's most significant. The Festival introduced new sessions, Literary Idol, a cross between Dragons’ Den and Pop Idol, and Big Ideas, where authors went up on stage to speak on a topic of their choice along with the Festival Prologue, a series of three-day workshops held on the weekend before the Festival. Among the author attendees were Saud AlSanousi, Paddy Ashdown, Pam Ayres, Henry Blofeld, Eoin Colfer, Nicholas Evans, Richard and Judy, Vivian French, Sally Gardner, Joanne Harris, Christina Lamb, Andrew Motion, Jeremy Paxman, Sir Tim Rice, and Ahdaf Soueif.

In 2015, over 130 authors were attending the seventh festival, that was themed "Wonderland". The event featured best-selling authors worldwide, including Chimamanda Ngozi Adichie, Charley Boorman, Nawal El-Saadawi, David Mitchell, Michael Morpurgo, HE Sheikha Lubna Bint Khalid Al Qasimi, David Walliams, and Markus Zusak. The festival also presented the first-ever UAE appearance of the life-size War Horse puppets, Joey and Topthorn, at the War Horse Concert, and the performance of 'Knight of Peace' by Jason Kouchak to critical acclaim. Throughout the year, the festival had conducted a survey for the favorite Arabic and English books of the UAE. The results were announced during the festival to be Parapsychology by Ali Al-Wardi, as the top Arabic book and Harper Lee's To Kill A Mockingbird as the top English book.

In 2016, more than 150 authors were attending the eighth festival, which was held for over two weeks for the first time due to the high demand from authors worldwide to participate in the festival. it was themed "Time". Authors in attendance included Saud Alsanousi, Simon Armitage, Lauren Child, Ann Cleeves, Carol Ann Duffy, Lisa Faulkner, Farah Chamma, A. C. Grayling, Anthony Horowitz, Dom Joly, Robert Lindsay, Anchee Min, John Julius Norwich, Ian Rankin, John Torode, Marcia Williams, among a host of others from over 30 countries.

"Journeys" was the theme for the festival's ninth year in 2017, over 180 authors attended the festival, which was held over nine days, including two weekends. Notable authors included Jeffrey Archer, Jon Ronson, Christina Lamb, Kathy Reichs, Francesca Simon, Alan Titchmarsh, Ben Miller, Nadiya Hussain, Andrew Davies, Lucy Hawking, Yasmina Khadra, Frank Gardner, Jo Malone, Eric Van Lustbader, Sana Amanat, John Hemingway, Omar Saif Ghobash and Farah Chamma. More than 30 countries were represented at the 2017 Festival, and of the 180+ authors, 40 were Emirati. The 2017 Festival had a strong focus on happiness and positivity, with several sessions discussing the ways to achieve happiness. A special panel discussion was also held at the festival featuring Ohood bint Khalfan Al Roumi, Minister of State for Happiness, discussing Sheikh Mohammed Bin Rashid Al Maktoum's latest book, Reflections on Happiness and Positivity.

In 2018, The 10th festival featured over 180 authors from nearly 50 countries and focused on the theme "Memories". Authors included David Walliams, Kevin Kwan, Cheryl Strayed, Anthony Horowitz, Jacqueline Wilson, Shashi Tharoor, Saroo Brierley, Mahur Jaffrey, Ken Hom, Muhammad Yunus, Mohammed Hasan Alwan, Omar Saif Ghobash, and Rhianna Pratchett. For the first time, the festival hosted a poetry evening at the Dubai Opera. For the Love of Words, presented by the Emirates Airline Festival of Literature, Dubai Opera, the Ministry of Tolerance, and the British Council, gathered the best of the UK and UAE's contemporary poets under one roof. Khalid Al Budoor, Nujoom Nasser Al Ghanem, Afra Atiq, Carol Ann Duffy, Simon Armitage, John Agard, Imitiaz Dharkerre, Hussain Lootah, Roger McGough, Grace Nichols, Lemn Sissay, and Harry Baker entertained a packed theatre of poetry performance enthusiasts.

The Emirates Airline Festival of Literature has also commemorated its 10th anniversary with the publication of a limited-edition book, which launched at the opening ceremony of the festival. For the Love of Words features eighty-four inspirational voices that have been a part of the Emirates Airline Festival of Literature over the years. The anthology is a collection of articles, poems, short stories, and illustrations that celebrate the love of words.

In 2019, more than 180 authors gathered at the 11th Emirates Airline Festival of Literature. Highlight authors included Jeff Kinney, Nathan H. Lents, Chris Gardner, Ahmad AlShugairi, Dame Darcey Bussell, Tony Blackburn, Sally Helgesen, Saud Alsanousi, Jane Hawking, Cassandra Clare, Holly Black, and Ian Rankin. The theme was "United by Words".

In 2020, the program focused on "Tomorrow" and included over 130 well-known authors and personalities from a variety of fields. Hazzaa Al Mansoori, the first Emirati in space, was one of the attendees. As part of the festival's stance as a family-friendly event that appeals to audiences of all ages, Oliver Jeffers, a visual artist and children's book author, also attended the festival.

In 2021, the festival was held in three venues, Jameel Arts Centre, InterContinental Dubai Festival City, and Alserkal Avenue, over three weekends. Additionally, the programme featured Malala Yousefzai and Lemn Sissay, as well as Avni Doshi, Shahad AlRawi, Shamma Al Bastaki and Danabelle Gutierre. Designers Camil Karam & Hussein Alazaat also attended and discussed the history and evolution of Arab publications as part of the programme that was themed "Change the Story".

In 2022, the Emirates Airline Festival of Literature took place at Habtoor City hotels, in Dubai, in partnership with Emirates Airline and the Dubai Culture & Arts Authority and was themed "Here Comes the Sun". The majority of the sessions were held there, but some special events were held at expo2020 and Jameel Arts Centre. Guests included: Ahmed Mourad, Sara Gay Forden, Myrna Ayad, Julia Quinn, Azza Fahmy, Lucinda Dickens-Hawksley and Gary Vee. The festival also brought back the dessert stanzas event.

== Awards ==
- The Emirates Airline Festival of Literature won the Middle East Event Awards’ Best Festival Award three times, in 2013, 2014 and 2015.
- The Festival was awarded Best Family Friendly Day Out Award at the Time Out Kids Awards 2016 and Favorite Festival at the What's On Awards 2016.
- The Festival won the Best Arts & Culture Event at the Middle East Special Events Award in 2018.
- In 2019, the festival won the MEPRA Awards in two categories: Gold Winner for Best Consumer Services Campaign and Gold Winner for Best Non-Profit/ Humanitarian/ Charitable Campaign.
- In 2020, the festival won the Gold Award in MEPRA Awards for Best Arts & Culture Campaign.
- In 2020, the festival won the Gulf Sustainability and CSR awards, in two categories: Best Sustainability Education or Awareness Program, and Best Community Development.
- In 2021, the festival won the Gold Award in MEPRA Awards for Best Arts & Culture Campaign, Best Consumer Services Campaign and Best Use of Limited Budget.
