= Abulhoul =

Abulhoul is a surname. Notable people with the surname include:

- Dubai Abulhoul, Emirati writer
- Isobel Abulhoul, Emirati businesswoman
