= Computer science education in the United Kingdom =

Aspect of computer science education

Computer science education in the United Kingdom is carried out in the UK mostly from the age of 11. It is a predominantly male subject.

In their teenage years, around 3% of girls are interested in computing as a career, as opposed to 17% of boys.

== History ==
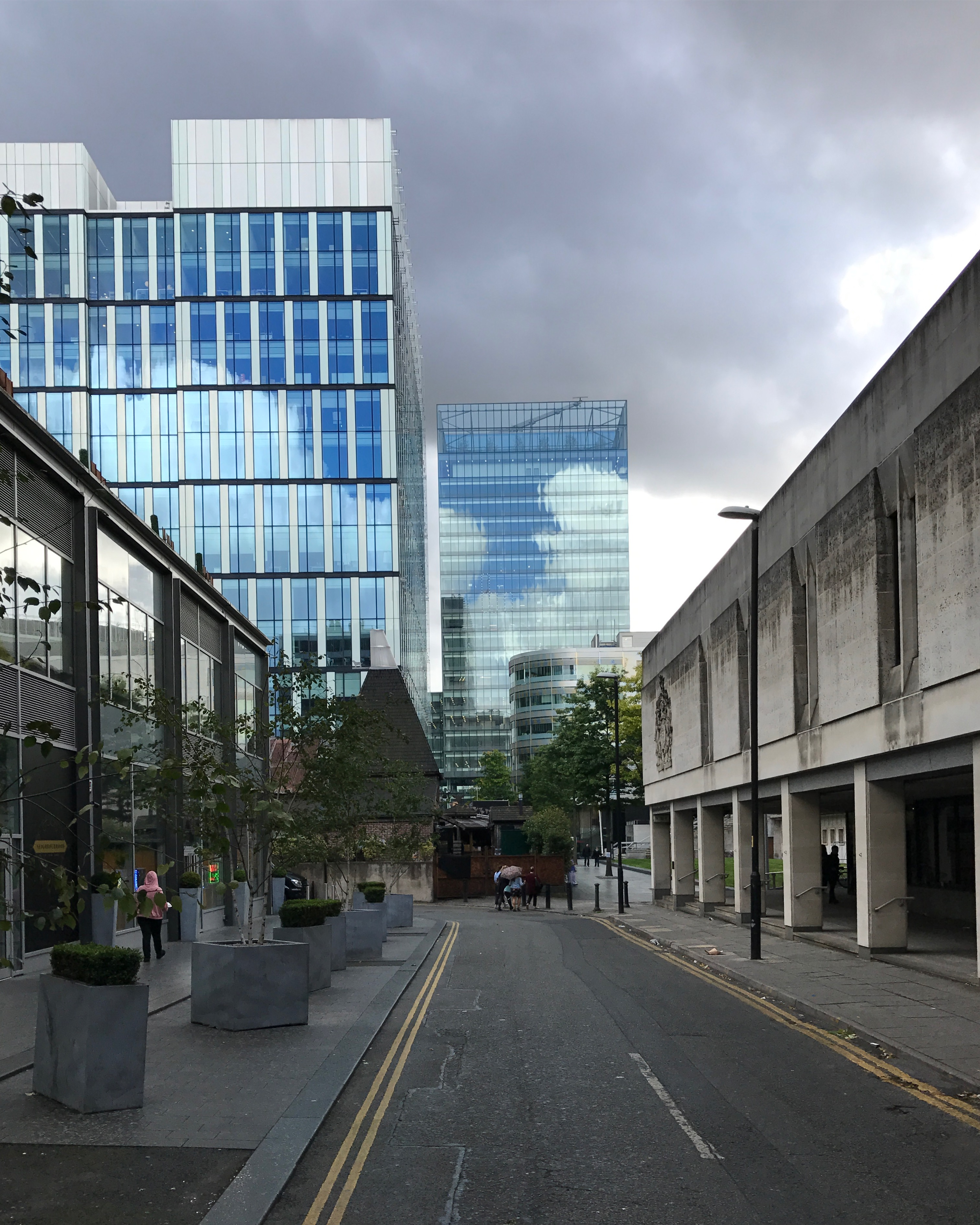
Former site of the NCC in Manchester, 1 Spinningfields, seen in 2017

=== 1950s ===
Newcastle University set up a computing centre from July 1957, under probability statistician Ewan Stafford Page.

The University of Glasgow set up the first computing laboratory in Scotland in 1957, under Dennis Cyril Gilles. It had an English Electric DEUCE from 1958 until 1965.

=== 1960s ===
In 1964 the £2m Atlas computer at the University of London opened.

From May 1965 Imperial College had an IBM 7090, opened by Tony Giffard, 3rd Earl of Halsbury; the computing centre was run by Stanley Gill and John Laski.

In July 1966, Bill Broderick, a Maths teacher since 1962 at the Royal Liberty Grammar School raised £17,000 from local industry to install a Elliott 903 computer, the first school in Europe to have a computer. This computer was later moved to Havering College of Further and Higher Education. Mr Broderick persuaded the University of London to establish a sixth form course in Computing.

In the 15 years to 1966, the UK had 1,500 computers installed, with another 750 computers on order. The UK had no regional computer networks; the US had over 30 regional networks, centred on universities. The Flowers Report, published on 27 January 1966, had wanted three of these regional computing centres to be urgently formed. The Flowers Committee was set up in March 1965; it advocated that 10 to 15 large American computers were to be installed in British universities by 1970, to cost £30m over five years.

The Computer Board for Universities and Research Councils was formed in August 1966, prompted by the Flowers Report (Brian Flowers, Baron Flowers of the University of Manchester); it would eventually end up as Jisc in 1993.

Due to prompting by the Flowers Report, the University of Edinburgh opened the first regional computing centre, in the UK, in November 1966, with an English Electric KDF9, which was made at the EE factory in Kidsgrove in north Staffordshire. It would connect Glasgow and Strathclyde, in the Scottish Regional Computing Organization. It cost £750,000. Sidney Michaelson became the head of Edinburgh computer unit

In 1967 the first GCE A-level in Computing was sat.

The National Computing Centre was formed on 10 June 1966, to cost £290,000 with a staff of 45 by April 1967, in Manchester, at Quay House on Quay Street in Spinningfields. It would be equipped with a £400,000 English Electric Leo Marconi KDF9, followed by a ICT 1904. It was officially opened by the Prime Minister on 5 May 1967.

In 1967 there was an acute shortage of systems analysts, with 11,000 needed by 1970, for around 3,000 installed computers across the UK. So in June 1967 the NCC launched a prototype six-week course for systems analysts, which it would expand across the UK, under its tutelage, at 20-35 colleges, from November 1967. The course was first taught at Bradenham Manor, near High Wycombe. The course was developed with the City & Guilds Institute. It was hoped that 16,000 would be taught per year. This course was developed by Alan Daniels and Donald Yeates.

Two colleges were to train the teachers for the new NCC course, with Hatfield College of Technology from 26 June 1967, followed by Staffordshire College of Technology in early July 1967; English Electric had a factory nearby, at Kidsgrove, later GEC. In the 1960s, languages included COBOL, invented by the US Department of Defense, and Fortran and PL/I, invented by IBM; Daniel D. McCracken wrote guides to these languages.

In 1968, a team in London came up with BCPL.

The £1m Northumbrian Universities multi access computer (NUMAC), a IBM System/360 Model 67 was officially opened in March 1968, for Durham and Newcastle universities, in the Claremont Tower, on Claremont Road. A 'national data processing service' (NDPS), run by the GPO in London, was planned, to possibly link up these regional computer networks.

Lancaster University had a Computer Science course from September 1968. The first year would be a mathematics course.

The first multi-access computer systems were founded at Edinburgh and Cambridge. The largest computer in the UK, throughout the 1960s, was the Atlas Computer Laboratory; the subsequent JANET network was founded there, linked to Daresbury in Cheshire, and is still headquartered there. In the mid-1960s the main London centre also had an Atlas computer, Imperial College an IBM 7090, and the Science Research Council, also an Atlas.

A national computer network, mostly what subsequently ended up as JANET, was first proposed in August 1968, to cost £30m, with two main centres in London and Manchester.

Heriot Watt was the first to offer a computer science degree in Scotland; in 1968 it received a £112,000 computer from the Computer Board for Universities and Research Councils, an Elliott 4130.

=== 1970s ===
In November 1970 the University of Surrey connected an ICL 1905 computer to four local secondary schools via a Teletype Model 33, including Godalming County Grammar School and Charterhouse, to trial computer education.

A regional computer network would open at Manchester in 1972, with a £2m CDC 7600, with would connect Keele, Liverpool, Salford, UMIST, and Lancaster.

In May 1972 the University of London wanted to connect eight other universities with a CDC 7600, by late 1972.

By 1976 the Post Office had developed its Experimental Packet-Switched Service, later called Packet Switch Stream (PSS), which was the first of its type in Europe. It had 13 Ferranti Argus 700E computers, three in Glasgow and Manchester, and seven in London. This was later connected to SATNET, and the Post Office developed it into the International Packet Switched Service in 1978.

NORSAR, a geology institute, at Kjeller in Eastern Norway, had been connected to ARPANET in June 1973, the first outside of the US, via satellite to the Tanum Teleport in Tanum Municipality, Sweden, which opened in 1972, to the Seismic Data Analysis Center at in Alexandria, Virginia. UCL connected to NORSAR on 25 July 1973. UCL was connected to the ARPANET, via a PDP-9.

In March 1975 Newcastle University installed a £2m IBM System/370. Newcastle Polytechnic had joined NUMAC in 1971. It was replaced by an Amdahl 5860 in 1985.

On 3 November 1977, a new £1m computer was opened at the University of Aberdeen, in West Seaton, by Henry Chilver, Baron Chilver, which was the first of its kind in the UK.

=== 1980s ===
Secondary schools taught logic, hardware and binary up to the age of 16 together with the programming language BASIC.

In 1978 the UK had 1,093 computer science undergraduates; by 1980 this had leapt to 1,754.

=== 1990s ===
Computer science was taught much less across schools up to 16. Computer science was largely only taught from 16 to 18.

9,000 Computer Science A-levels per year were taken in the early 1990s.

=== 2000s ===
Computer science was infrequently taught in schools up to the age of 16.

=== 2010s ===
The 2010 general election would result in a swift change in education policy on computer science education across England. The subject had not been taught as widespread as it could have been, and much more emphasis would now be placed on developing hard-core computing skills, and for primary schools too.

In January 2012 the Royal Society published a report entitled Shut down or restart? The way forward for computing in UK schools. Also in 2012, Code Club was founded; another group initiative is CoderDojo.

From 2014 a new PGCE in Computing has been offered by UK universities.

From September 2014 in England, computing teaching was now compulsory from the age of 5. Computer science GCSE and A levels have been made more rigorous. From around 2014 the new Computing GCSE has been taken.

In November 2018 the government-funded National Centre for Computing Education was founded at the University of York, to coordinate training for computing teachers in England.

The Institute of Coding was launched in 2018.

== Nations ==
=== England ===
Computing teaching is mandatory at English schools from ages 5-16. There are around 438,000 teachers in England, with around 18,000 computing teachers; only around 35% have a relevant degree.

=== Scotland ===
Education Scotland introduced its Curriculum for Excellence -Technologies in 2010. Secondary school starts at the age of 12 in Scotland.

=== Wales ===
Wales introduced its Curriculum for Life in September 2018.

=== Northern Ireland ===
The Northern Ireland Curriculum features computer science to a lesser extent than now found in England.

== Primary education ==
There are around 21,000 primary schools across the UK.

Teaching applications at primary level are Scratch, PICAXE, Micro Bit and Kodu Game Lab.

== Secondary education ==
There are approximately 4,000 secondary schools throughout the UK.

Secondary schools develop applications most (21%) in Python, followed by Scratch (19%).

There are around 20% female candidates of Computing GCSE, with around 65,000 total candidates in 2017. Four times the proportion of girls choose computing GCSE at girls schools, as opposed to girls at co-educational secondary schools.

=== Computing teachers ===
Teacher development is offered through the Computing At School Network of Excellence, run by universities.

== Sixth form ==
9% of Computing A-level candidates are female. In 2017 there were around 8,300 total candidates. Numbers of candidates went down from around 5,600 in 2007 to around 3,800 in 2012, but numbers have been steadily rising since 2012.

For Scotland, Advanced Highers Computing has 14% female candidates. In 2017 there were around 650 total Computing candidates.

== University ==
For English universities around 12% of first degree entrants are female.

There are around 500 applications a year for UCAS Teacher Training in Computing.

Around 16,500 applied to study computing at university in 2003; by 2007 it was around 10,600.

== University research ==
=== Artificial intelligence ===
In the 1980s AI research, in the UK, was largely led by the three universities of Essex, Edinburgh and Imperial College. At Edinburgh Donald Michie led the Machine Intelligence Research Unit.

Geoffrey Hinton later developed artificial intelligence at Edinburgh, working with Christopher Longuet-Higgins.

== Broadcasting ==
- The Learning Machine, BBC 1 25 April 1985 on Thursdays at 11pm, repeated on Sundays at 12pm; presented by Timothy O'Shea, of the Microelectronics in Schools Project of the Open University, and featured Celia Hoyles, Aaron Sloman, Benedict du Boulay and Alex d'Agapeyeff; Produced by Ian Woolf, directed by Robert Albury. Repeated January 1986, and May 1986

== Results by LEA in England ==
Results shown are for 2016.

=== Highest number of entries for Computer Science A-level ===
- Hampshire - 328
- Hertfordshire - 172
- Kent - 164
- Lancashire - 141
- Surrey - 119
- Essex - 104
- Birmingham - 103
- Cambridgeshire - 100
- West Sussex - 91
- Leicestershire - 88

== Publications ==
- CS4FN, published twice a year, goes to over 2,000 secondary schools.

== See also ==
- Mathematics education in the United Kingdom
