= Agrafka Creative Workshop =

Graphic design firm in Lviv, Ukraine

Agrafka
- Native name: Аґрафка
- Type: Film
- Industry: Design Studio
- Founded: 2010
- Founder: Roman Romanyshyn; Andriy Leshiv
- Headquarters: Lviv, Ukraine

The Agrafka Creative Workshop is a design studio founded by Ukrainian artists Romana Romanyshyn and Andriy Lesiv. The studio is specialized in graphics, painting, and design. It has won international awards in the field of book illustration, including the Biennial International Award for Illustration and the 2018 Bologna Ragazzi Award.

== History ==
Romanyshyn and Lesiv began working in book illustration while they were still students at the Lviv State College of Decorative and Applied Arts from 1999 to 2003. After they graduated, they received a proposal from the Lviv-based publishing house Літопис ("Chronicle") to create cover art for the novel Naive by Erlend Loe. The duo continued to design for Chronicle, producing general designs for two poetry collections: "Withered Leaves" by Ivan Franko in 2006 and "Three Rings" by Bohdan Ihor Antonych in 2008. Their work on "Withered Leaves" was especially important, as it represented their first complete work which encompassed design, layout, and graphics.

Romanyshyn and Lesiv continued their studies in book design during an internship in Krakow in 2010 as part of the Polish Minister of Culture's "Gaude Polonia" scholarship. During this period they worked on the last piece by Polish Nobel Prize laureate Wislawa Szymborska, a collection of poems called "Może To Wszystko". The collection was published by BoSz and received praise from the author.

In 2011, Agrafka undertook its first children's book project. Produced alongside the Bogdan Textbook publishing house, the book, a Ukrainian folk tale, was recognized as the best book at the Lviv International Children's Festival, won the Grand Prix Children's Book Prize, and was recognized in the 2012 edition of White Ravens, an international catalog of children's books. Working again with Bogdan Textbook, Agrafka illustrated another Ukrainian folk tale called "Turnip" in 2012. The book won the Lion's Children's Book Award for Best Art and was included in White Ravens in 2013.

In the following years, Agrafka cooperated closely with the Old Lion Publishing House. The publishing house put out four books illustrated by Agrafka: "Antomies" and "Stars and Poppies" in 2014, and "My Home and Things in It" and "The War that Changed Rondo" in 2015. In 2015, Old Lion, Agrafka, and authors O. Dumanska and G. Tereshchuk produced the first book in a series of alphabet encyclopedias which won Best Book of the Publishers' Forum. The next year, they designed a supplement to the series which also won Best Book of the Publishers' Forum and earned the All-Ukrainian title of Book of the Year 2016.

== Awards ==
- 2006: 13th Publishers' Forum in Lviv Prize for "Withered Leaves"
- 2009: International Renaissance Foundation Awards for design of world humanitarian classics
- 2011: Children's Book Prize Grand Prix for the Ukrainian folk tale "Glove"
- 2011: 18th Publishers' Forum in Lviv Book of the Year for the Ukrainian folk tale "Glove"
- 2011: 23rd International Biennial Award for Illustration for the Ukrainian folk tale "Glove"
- 2013: Included in the White Ravens annual catalog for "Turnip"
- 2014: International Children's Book Fair Bologna Award (Opera Prima category) for "Stars and Poppies"
- 2015: International Children's Book Fair Bologna Special Award (New Horizons category) for "The War That Changed Rondo"
- 2015: Publishers' Forum Best Book for the alphabet encyclopedia "Sheptytsky from A to Z"
- 2016: Frankfurt Book Fair Global Illustration Award (Cover Illustration category) for "George's Secret Key to the Universe"
- 2018: Bologna Ragazzi Award (children's non-fiction category) for the original books "Loud, Quiet, Whispers" and "I See So"
- 2018: Book Arsenal Grand Prix (Best Book Design category) for "I See So"
- 2019: South Korea Nami Concours Winner for "Farewell"
- 2019: 38th Andersen Prize Winner for "Loud, Quiet, Whispers"
- 2020: ED-Awards Gold Medal (Book and Publishing Illustration category) for "Optics of God"
