= Kamand Kojouri =

Iranian-Canadian Writer

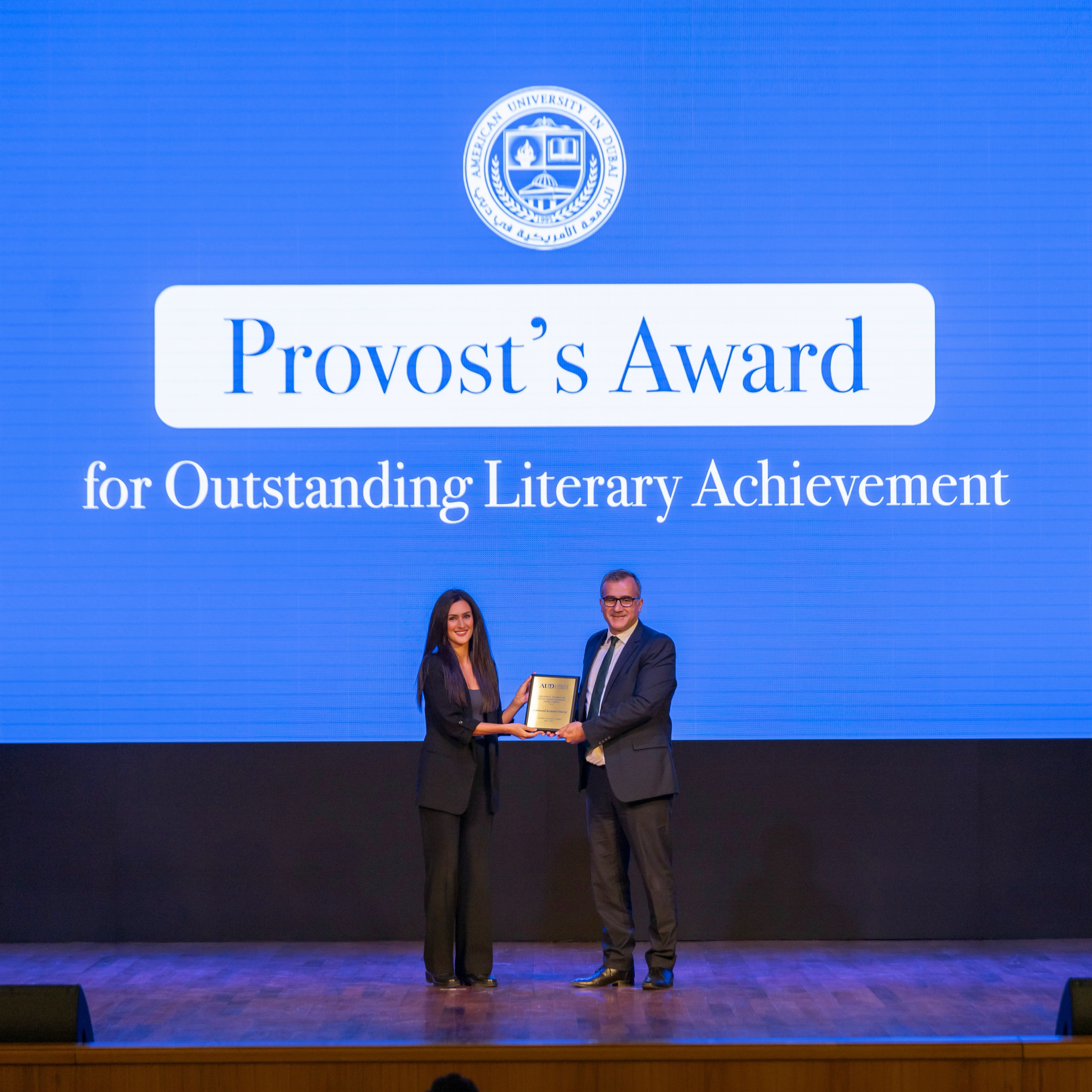
Kamand Kojouri (left) receiving the Outstanding Literary Achievement Award from the American University in Dubai, presented by the university's Provost, Assaad Farah.

Kamand Kojouri (born 29 October 1991) is a writer, poet, academic, and fellow of the Emirates Literature Foundation. She is the author of two poetry collections, The Eternal Dance and God, Does Humanity Exist?. Her poems and short stories have been published in anthologies and broadcast on BBC Radio 4. Her work has been featured in El País, The Irish Times, and BBC Persian Television. Kamand's poem "Let My Silence Grow" was later adapted into a chorale composition by Zachary J. Moore and performed internationally, including by the Luther College Nordic Choir.

== Biography ==
Kamand was born in Tehran and raised in the U.A.E. and Canada. She obtained an M.A. in Creative Writing from City St George's, University of London and a Ph.D. in Creative Writing from Swansea University.

Kamand is currently an Assistant Professor of English at the American University in Dubai.

== Awards ==
- "Felix" was shortlisted for the Rhys Davies National Short Story Award in 2024.
- Awarded the First Chapter 2026 Emirates Literature Foundation Seddiqi Writers' Fellowship.
