= Dubai Abulhoul =

Emirati writer

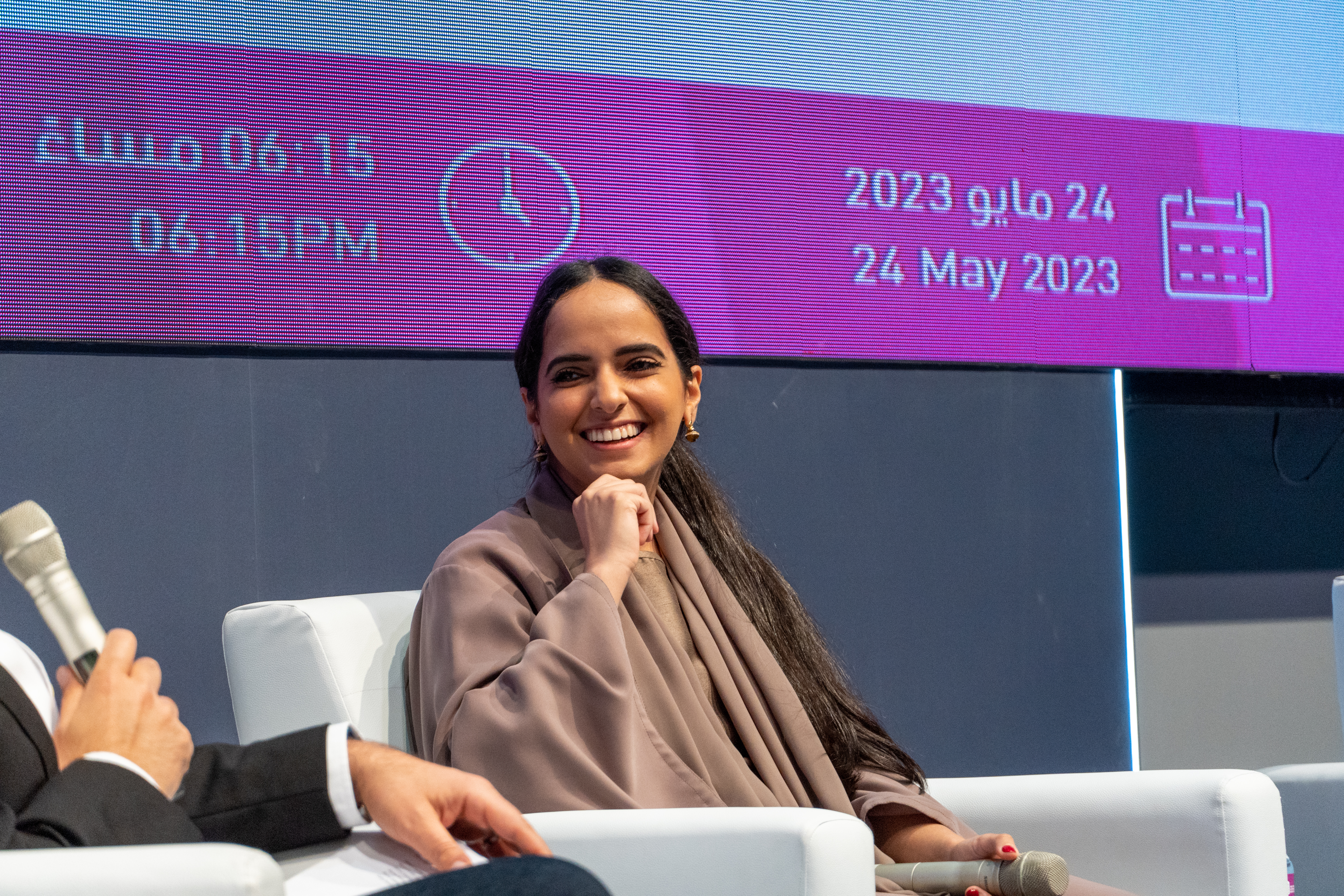
- Born: 1996 (age 29–30); United Arab Emirates
- Education: BA in political science; MA in Global Governance & Diplomacy; New York University Abu Dhabi; University of Oxford
- Occupation: CEO at Fiker Institute

Dubai Abulhoul (Arabic: دبي بالهول) is an Emirati author and columnist. Having published five books since 2012, Abulhoul works as a columnist for the "Al Bayan" and "Gulf Today" newspapers and is CEO of the Fiker Institute, a global affairs and governance think tank that she founded in 2021.

Abulhoul is also a member of the World Economic Forum's Future of Geopolitics Council and a member of the COP28 President's Advisory Committee.

== Education and career ==
Dubai Abulhoul was born in the United Arab Emirates in 1996. In 2008, at age 11, she released the animated film Galagolia, for which she was named the Youngest Director of the Middle East, given a special recognition award at the Gulf Film festival, and allowed to present at TEDx-Dubai in 2009. In 2012 she published the fantasy novel Galagolia: The Hidden Divination and presented it at the Emirates Airline Festival of Literature. For her work in literature, youth advocacy, and journalism, Abulhoul was appointed to the Salama Bin Hamdan Al-Nahyan Foundation's Advisory Committee from 2014 to 2015, named Young Arab of the Year at the inaugural Young Arab Awards of ITP Media Group in 2016, and appointed to the Emirates Youth Council by the UAE government from 2016 to 2017.

She graduated from New York University Abu Dhabi with a bachelor's degree in political science in 2017. A year later, she earned her master's degree in Global Governance and Diplomacy from the University of Oxford, studying as a Rhodes scholar. Between 2018 and 2020 Abulhoul was a diplomat at the UAE Cabinet.

In 2021 Abulhoul founded the Fiker Institute, an Emirati think tank and strategic studies center. It weighs in on foreign affairs, general policies, and global governance with the goal of reshaping the narrative surrounding the Middle East. It is headquartered in Dubai with Abulhoul as its CEO.

== Works ==
=== Films ===
- Galagolia, 2008

=== Novels ===
- Galagolia: The Hidden Divination, 2012

=== Short story collections ===
- "Rafai Speech" (original title: Khetab Rafai), 2018
- "The Boys’ Mum" (original title: Um al-Sibian), 2018
- "Al Dasis People" (original title: Qaoum al-Dasis), 2019
- “Bu al-Slasil”, 2019

== Awards ==
- 2008: Special recognition award for her animated film Galagolia at the Gulf Film festival.
- 2016: Young Arab of the Year award at the inaugural Young Arab Awards of ITP Media Group for her work in literature, journalism, and youth advocacy.

== See also ==
- Afra Atiq
- Eman Al Yousuf
- Nadia Al Najjar
