= George and the Blue Moon =

2016 children's book by Lucy and Stephen Hawking

- Cover
- Authors: Lucy Hawking, Stephen Hawking
- Language: English
- Genre: Popular science
- Published: 2016 Doubleday
- Publication place: United Kingdom
- Pages: 336
- ISBN: 9780857533289
- Preceded by: George and the Unbreakable Code
- Followed by: George and the Ship of Time

George and the Blue Moon is a 2016 children's book written by Lucy and Stephen Hawking with Christophe Galfard. The book was preceded by George's Secret Key to the Universe in 2007, George's Cosmic Treasure Hunt in 2009, George and the Big Bang in 2011 and George and the Unbreakable Code in 2014.

The book was aimed at readers aged 8+years.

== See also ==
- A Brief History of Time by Stephen Hawking
- Black Holes and Baby Universes and Other Essays
- George's Secret Key to the Universe
- George's Cosmic Treasure Hunt
- George and the Big Bang
- George and the Unbreakable Code
