= Immortality Drive =

Large memory device

The Immortality Drive is a large memory device which was taken to the International Space Station in a Soyuz spacecraft on October 12, 2008. Its purpose is to preserve human DNA in a time capsule, in case some global cataclysm should occur on Earth.

The drive contains fully digitized DNA sequences of a select group of humans such as physicist Stephen Hawking, comedian and talk show host Stephen Colbert, Playboy model Jo Garcia, game designer Richard Garriott, fantasy authors Tracy Hickman and Laura Hickman, pro wrestler Matt Morgan, and athlete Lance Armstrong.

The microchip also contains a copy of George's Secret Key to the Universe, a 2007 children's book authored by Stephen Hawking and his daughter, Lucy. Players from the video game Tabula Rasa were also selected to be among the list of people to get their DNA launched into space; these players were randomly selected from those who logged into Tabula Rasa throughout Operation Immortality's duration, which ended on September 29, 2008:

- Ryan Gerdes – Hull, GA
- Jesse Moore – Springfield, MO
- Matthew DeLucia – Fultondale, AL
- Christopher Stuckey – Atlanta, GA
- Benjamin Schramm – Bakersfield, CA
- Shane Woodford – Hampden, ME
- Randall Strye, Jr – Mount Pleasant, MI
- Jason Van Ess – Salem, OR
- Christopher Grabowski – North Port, FL
- Jolyn Barreuther – Council Bluffs, IA
- Kelvin Malone – Houston, TX
- James Noble – Las Vegas, NV
- Troy Hieb – Hermantown, MN
- Shannon Layne – Cheyenne, WY
- Adam Davis – Dallas, TX
- Jacob VanStone – Puyallup, WA
- Walter Bratcher – Ocala, FL
- Jed Johnson – Sauk Rapids, MN
- Robert Sutton – Beaumont, TX
- Steven Todd – Huntsville, AL
- Erik Finch – Austin, TX
- Byron Johnson – Manor, TX
- Rolf Weber – Glendale, AZ

The Immortality Drive was featured in History Channel's Life After People, first-season episode "The Bodies Left Behind".

== See also ==
- List of time capsules
