= PALME Middle East =

Middle East's longest-standing trade show

- Status: Active
- Genre: Events, Trade shows, Awards, Exhibition, Conferences
- Venue: Dubai International Convention Centre
- Location: Dubai
- Country: United Arab Emirates
- Attendance: 5000+
- Organized by: Informa Exhibitions
- Website: www.palme-middleeast.com

PALME Middle East is Middle East’s longest-standing trade show for the professional sound, light, audiovisual, music, entertainment, and systems integration industries. The show has over 5000 visitors. The exhibition is for products and services including equipment, systems, and software for projects in the professional entertainment, event, construction, and installation sectors.

The show has two further subsections, INSTALL and MUSAC, each of which caters to a targeted sector of the industry. PALME Middle East is organized by Informa Exhibitions, the organisers of Arab Health, and takes place at the Dubai International Convention Centre(DICEC). The show is co-located with the Middle East EVENT Show. INSTALL presents AV installation and integration technologies, and MUSAC is a regional forum for traditional and contemporary musical instruments and accessories.

The PALME Middle East DJ Competition, founded in 2003, is an annual open competition which takes the form of several live heats in the weeks preceding the PALME Middle East exhibition, with the live finals taking place during the show itself. The competition is judged by a panel of local DJs and industry experts. DJ Pete Martin was responsible for the competition from its launch in 2003 to 2008 respectively. 2013 will see the competition in its 10th year.

Alongside the exhibition, PALME Middle East runs a series of technically focussed educational seminars and workshops. In previous years, the PALME educational programme has taken the form of a paid for conference, but from 2012 the seminars are free to attend. In 2011, the conference was split into three streams: lighting, projection technology and home automation

== PALME Awards ==
The PALME Awards ceremony is an annual awards event that runs alongside PALME Middle East, for achievement within the professional sound, light, audio visual, music, entertainment and systems integration industries. In 2011 the PALME Awards comprised the following categories:

- AV & Installation
  - Residential - Best integrated home
  - Commercial - Best AV / Video Solution
  - Best Entertainment Venue in the Middle East
  - Most Innovative New AV Product of the Year
- Lighting & Installation
  - Best intelligent lighting fixture of the year
  - Best use of lighting - Exterior
  - Best use of lighting - Hospitality & Leisure
- Audio & Installation
  - Best use of a PA system for Public Buildings
  - Latest Innovation for a loudspeaker
  - Best Pro Audio technology of the year
- Special Award: Most significant individual who has contributed to the AV Industry in the Middle East
