= George and the Unbreakable Code =

2014 novel by Lucy Hawking

- First edition
- Authors: Lucy Hawking; Stephen Hawking
- Genre: Popular science
- Publisher: Doubleday Childrens
- Publication date: 2014
- Pages: 352
- ISBN: 9780857533258
- Preceded by: George and the Big Bang
- Followed by: George and the Blue Moon

George and the Unbreakable Code is a 2014 children's book written by Stephen and Lucy Hawking. The book is the fourth book in the George series, following George's Secret Key to the Universe, George's Cosmic Treasure Hunt, and George and the Big Bang, and preceding George and the Blue Moon.

== See also ==
- A Brief History of Time by Stephen Hawking
- Black Holes and Baby Universes and Other Essays by Stephen Hawking
- George's Secret Key to the Universe
- George's Cosmic Treasure Hunt
- George and the Big Bang
- George and the Blue Moon
