= George's Secret Key to the Universe =

2007 novel by Lucy and Stephen Hawking

- First edition
- Authors: Lucy Hawking, Stephen Hawking, Christophe Galfard
- Genre: Popular science
- Published: 2007 Doubleday
- Publication place: United Kingdom
- Pages: 297
- ISBN: 978-1-4169-5462-0
- OCLC: 175286050
- Followed by: George's Cosmic Treasure Hunt

George's Secret Key to the Universe is a 2007 children's book written by Lucy and Stephen Hawking with Christophe Galfard. Upon its release, the book received mixed reviews, and was followed by five sequels, George's Cosmic Treasure Hunt in 2009, George and the Big Bang in 2011, George and the Unbreakable Code in 2014 and George and the Blue Moon in 2016 and George and the Ship of Time in 2018.

== Synopsis ==
The main characters in the book are George Greenby, Susan Bellis, Eric Bellis, Annie Bellis, Dr. Reeper, and Cosmos, the world's most powerful computer. Cosmos can draw windows allowing people to look into outer space, as well as doors that act as portals allowing travel into outer space. Written like a story, it aims to describe various aspects of the universe in a manner that is accessible to children and others new to the topic. It starts by describing atoms, stars, planets, and their moons. It then goes on to describe black holes, which remains the topic of focus in the last part of the book. At frequent intervals throughout the book, there are pictures and "fact files" of the different references to universal objects, including a picture of Mars with its moons.

== Production ==
It was reported in June 2006 that Stephen and Lucy Hawking would be writing a children's book with Christophe Galfard, with the aim of "explaining theoretical physics in an accessible way to youngsters." The book, whose title was announced in June 2007, was released on October 23, 2007.

== Reception ==
The Independent gave the book a positive review, calling it an "excellent book" that "will do wonders to raise enthusiasm for physics among young readers". It did, however, add that the storytelling has some rough edges, and noted the book had a couple of scientific inaccuracies. About.com gave the book 3 1/2 out of 5, stating "Recommended for kids, but not for adults. The story in this book is a bit contrived, but as a book intended to teach children the basics of astronomy, astrophysics, cosmology, and other principles that govern our universe, it does a fair job." The reviewer from Kirkus Reviews was more critical, accusing the authors of setting aside the laws of physics whenever convenient to the story. The reviewer concluded that they expected the book to sell well, but that it "doesn’t show much respect for its target audience". Common Sense Media gave the book 2 stars out of 5, stating "The nonfiction parts are fine: good information, clearly told, with some spectacular photos. But surprisingly, much of the fictional story isn't scientifically accurate. This might be forgivable in straight sci-fi or fantasy ... but in a book that purports to teach the basics of astronomy and physics, it's just confusing -- how are young readers to know what's true, what's theoretical, and what's just plain nonsense?"

The book was included on the time-capsule microchip, Immortality Drive, placed on the International Space Station in 2008

== See also ==
- A Brief History of Time by Stephen Hawking
- Black Holes and Baby Universes and Other Essays
- George's Cosmic Treasure Hunt
- George and the Big Bang
- George and the Unbreakable Code
- George and the Blue Moon
