= Dubai International Writers' Centre =

The Dubai International Writers' Centre (DIWC) is located in the Al Shindagha Historical Neighbourhood. Launched on 3 November 2014, it is part of the Emirates Literature Foundation, established in 2013 through a decree by the Prime Minister and Vice-President of the United Arab Emirates and Ruler of Dubai, Sheikh Mohammed bin Rashid Al Maktoum.

The Centre adjoins the new administrative offices of the Emirates Airline Festival of Literature and is designed to host a year-round program of events catering to the multicultural and multinational communities living in the region, as well as providing an international hub for writers and a space for visiting writers and writers-in-residence to share knowledge and expertise to locally-based writers and Centre users.

The Centre’s ongoing programme includes international conferences focusing on writing and literature as well as regional events for students, academics, GCC citizens and residents. The Centre also holds workshops, seminars and monthly readings in Arabic and English as well as hosting writing groups designed to appeal to both Emiratis and UAE residents.

In January 2015, the Centre launched the Writer-in-Residence series with travel writer Tim Mackintosh-Smith. The programme aims to allow writers to spend time developing a work in progress and participate in community outreach events to share their experiences.
