= George and the Big Bang =

2011 novel by Stephen and Lucy Hawking

- First edition
- Authors: Lucy Hawking; Stephen Hawking
- Genre: Science fiction
- Publisher: Doubleday Children's Books
- Publication date: 2011
- Pages: 304
- ISBN: 9780385611916
- Preceded by: George's Cosmic Treasure Hunt
- Followed by: George and the Unbreakable Code

George and the Big Bang is a 2011 children's book written by Stephen and Lucy Hawking. The book is the third book in the George series, following George's Secret Key to the Universe and George's Cosmic Treasure Hunt. George and the Big Bang is available in paperback, hardback and audio versions.

== Plot ==
After coming back to the United Kingdom, George and Annie are trying to find the best place in the universe for Freddy the pig to live. They first look in the fictional Foxbridge University where Eric is a professor. Once there, they head up into a meeting of an anti-LHC group, which states that the theory of everything resists addition of gravity (TOERAG). Eric uses Cosmos, a supercomputer, to open a portal and takes Freddy to this unknown place.

The next day, George starts at the local high school, but returns to the university to find Eric in order to ask him where Freddy has gone. George discovers that Cosmos' portal is still open and wanders out on to the Moon to find Eric. Just before they leave, a Chinese satellite photographs them. However, since no one has supposedly set foot on the Moon since 1972, this creates outrage among the Order of Science.Meanwhile, Annie has got a new friend: Vincent, a karate black belt and the son of a film director.

Eric's tutor, Zuzubin, calls a meeting of the Order of Science at CERN. Meanwhile, Dr. Reeper returns and activates his supercomputer Pooky so he can meet George in Andromeda via his electromechanical avatar. Dr. Reeper tells George that he has infiltrated TOERAG, the anti-LHC group. He also admits that he was forced to create a quantum mechanical bomb which cannot be defused easily, but luckily only has a probability to defuse if the right switch is activated. Dr. Reeper fails to pass on the complete information on how to deactivate the bomb, but he does tell George that the Order of Science has a traitor and that the meeting at the LHC (the meeting is at 7:30 in Switzerland) is actually a plot to destroy all the scientists and the LHC using his bomb.

Zuzubin, who was Eric’s tutor is actually the traitor that Dr. Reeper was saying, edits Eric’s lecture and changes what he said in the past. Next, Zuzubin sees George and Annie and tricks them into going into a portal that traps them in the Inverse Schrödinger trap. However, Annie’s friend, Vincent karate kicked Zuzubin. Zuzubin lays unconscious. Vincent grabs Zuzubin’s remote and lets George and Annie into the LHC. At TOERAG’s secret headquarters, the leaders had an inside view of the Large Hadron Collider. One of the leaders said to Reeper that he will enjoy it. As the clock reaches 7:30, George and Annie teleport inside the LHC and sets off some motion detectors that immediately pick up on the unauthorised human arrivals. George and Annie find what appears to be Schrödinger's cat. They walk down the machine and find what looks like a drinks dispenser but George remembers that the home has 8 levers and all one of them can arm — or disarm — the bomb. He also has the code to supposedly disarm the bomb. All they need to do was also to select the right drinks. George realised that correct one should be the 7th one — the Higgs particle — because it’s the only one that isn’t a type of subatomic particle that we know of (this is changed to the Higgs being the only particle that doesn't spin on its axis in versions printed after the discovery of the Higgs boson). They picked it and proceeded to write the code. The bomb was disarmed. Then, two people walked forward and asked why there were two children in the LHC. George and Annie explained themselves and Dr. Ling was surprised to see the bomb was in the drinks machine. Then, Eric says that ATLAS can run a show of the universe backwards all the way back to 13.7 billion years ago. Meanwhile, Vincent put Zuzubin in the Inverse Schrödinger trap.

== See also ==
- Black Holes and Baby Universes and Other Essays by Stephen Hawking
- George's Secret Key to the Universe
- George's Cosmic Treasure Hunt
- George and the Unbreakable Code
- George and the Blue Moon
