= Ahmed Masoud =

Ahmed Masoud may refer to:

- Ahmed Masoud (footballer)
- Ahmed Masoud (writer)
