= Palestine Festival of Literature =

Annual literary festival in Palestine

The Palestine Festival of Literature (PalFest) is an annual literary festival, founded in 2008, that takes place in cities across West Bank, Palestine.

== History ==
PalFest 2019 poster

PalFest 2012 poster: Gaza

The festival was founded in 2008 with the stated mission of affirming "the power of culture over the culture of power" and breaking what it considers a cultural siege against the West Bank. The festival's founding chair is the novelist and political commentator Ahdaf Soueif. Mahmoud Darwish sent a message to the inaugural festival in which he wrote: "Thank you dear friends for your noble solidarity, thank you for your courageous gesture to break the moral siege inflicted upon us and thank you because you are resisting the invitation to dance on our graves. We are here. We are still alive."

In an effort to overcome restrictions on Palestinians' freedom of movement, the festival travels to its audiences putting on free events in Arabic and English in the cities it travels to. The festival traditionally performs in Jerusalem, Ramallah, Haifa and Nablus. Because travel to Gaza is so restricted, far fewer events take place there. In 2012, the festival happened exclusively in Gaza, as it was able to discriminately pressure access through Rafah, Egypt. Visiting author China Miéville said the festival is "not only the most powerful and important literary festival it's ever been my privilege to attend, it's one of the most powerful and important things I've experienced, full stop".

Dozens of authors who attended the festival have gone on to write about their experiences in Palestine. In 2017, Bloomsbury published This Is Not a Border: Reportage & Reflection from the Palestine Festival of Literature – a collection of works from 47 authors who had participated in the festival, with additional messages from Chinua Achebe, Michael Ondaatje and J. M. Coetzee.

After ten editions, the organizers announced a break in 2018 to assess the role of the festival in a rapidly changing world. In 2019, the festival was re-launched with "a sharpened focus on how to foster new writing that clarifies and frames the connections between the recreation of Israel and the accelerating systems of control and dispossession around the world." In 2020 and 2021, the festival was cancelled again, this time because of the COVID-19 pandemic.

In January 2024, in support of South Africa's historic case at the International Court of Justice, the festival assembled a group of 31 international artists to read key passages from the dossier. The full cast includes Khalid Abdalla, Tunde Adebimpe, Gbenga Akinnagbe, Adam Bakri, Kathleen Chalfant, Steve Coogan, Liam Cunningham, Charles Dance, Natalie Diaz, Stephen Dillane, Inua Ellams, Paapa Essiedu, Lena Headey, Aida El-Kashef, Simon McBurney, Maaza Mengiste, Tobias Menzies, Sepideh Moafi, Indya Moore, Peter Mullan, Cynthia Nixon, Maxine Peake, Kendrick Sampson, Dario Ladani Sanchez, Susan Sarandon, Maisie Richardson-Sellers, Alia Shawkat, Wallace Shawn, Morgan Spector, Carice van Houten, Harriet Walter, and Zukiswa Wanner.

== Patrons and participants ==
Sir Philip Pullman said of the festival: "Every literary act, whether it is a great epic poem or an honest piece of journalism or a simple nonsense tale for children is a blow against the forces of stupidity and ignorance and darkness … The Palestine Festival of Literature exists to do just that – and I salute it for its work. Not only this year but for as long as it is necessary."

== Restrictions and closures ==
- 2009: In both the opening and closing nights attempts were made by the Israeli police to prevent the festival from taking place, since the Palestinian Authority was involved. Both times the festival relocated: to the French Cultural Institute on the first night and to the British Council on the last.
- 2011: The venue for the festival's closing event in Silwan was tear gassed.
- 2012: Closing event of the inaugural PalFest Gaza was shut down by the police. Attempts in 2009 and 2010 to hold PalFest Gaza were impeded when organizers were denied entry permits.
- 2015: Festival participant Sara Ishaq, Oscar-nominated film director, was prevented from entering the country by Israeli border police.
- 2015: Festival participant Ahmed Masoud was prevented from entering the country by Israeli border police.

== Awards ==
- 2010: Ahdaf Soueif Awarded Inaugural Mahmoud Darwish Award
- 2017: Hay Festival Award for Festivals
- 2019: Ahdaf Soueif Awarded European Cultural Foundation Culture Award
