= ITP Media Group =

Media company in the Middle East

- Founded: 1987; 39 years ago
- Headquarters: Dubai, United Arab Emirates
- Website: www.itp.com

ITP Media Group is a global media company founded in 1987. Its headquarters are in Dubai, and branch offices in Abu Dhabi (Capital of the UAE), Saudi Arabia, India, the United Kingdom, Germany and the USA. ITP has over 60 media brands that attract more than 50 million people per month across its consumer, business, and influencer divisions.

== Publications ==
Some of the magazine's more notable publications are listed below:

- Arabian Business
- Cosmopolitan Middle East
- Esquire Middle East
- Esquire Saudi Arabia
- Gault&Millau UAE
- Grazia Middle East
- Harper's Bazaar Arabia
- Harper's Bazaar Saudi Arabia
- Hotelier India
- Hotelier Middle East
- Time Out GCC
- Time Out Abu Dhabi
- Time Out Bahrain
- Time Out Doha
- Time Out Dubai
- Time Out DXB
- Time Out Kids UAE
- Time Out Muscat

Ceased publication

- L'Officiel Middle East

== ITP Live ==
ITP Live launched in 2017 as a full-service social media and influencer marketing agency. It has represented and worked with a multitude of local and international social media influencers such as Omar Borkan, Logan Paul, MoVlogs, Amanda Cerny, Olivia Culpo, Ahmed Al Nasheet, Layla Akil, Saygin Yalcin, and Shahad Al Khattab.

In May 2019, it partnered with OHM Live to raise funds for COVID-19 relief efforts. The 24-hour broadcast featured guest interviews and performances from Eva Longoria, Dua Lipa, Jason Derulo, CeeLo Green, Maluma and Deepak Chopra.

== Awards ==
The Arabian Business Awards regularly features winners such as the Ruler of Ras Al Khaimah, His Highness Sheikh Saud Bin Saqr Al Qasimi, Colm McLoughlin, and Mohamed Alabbar celebrities, diplomats, rulers, and other senior business people.

In 2019, the GQ Man of the Year Awards was held in Abu Dhabi's Louvre museum and was attended by footballer Mo Salah, supermodel Alessandra Ambrosio, and actor Mena Massoud. Also in 2019, Harper's Bazaar Arabia's World of Fashion Capsule was hosted by Victoria Beckham.
