= The Bamboo Stalk =

2012 novel by Saud Alsanousi

- Author: Saud Alsanousi
- Language: Arabic
- Genre: Novel
- Publisher: Arab Scientific Publishers, Inc.
- Publication date: 15 May 2012
- Publication place: Lebanon
- Pages: 396 pp (paperback)

The Bamboo Stalk (Arabic: ساق البامبو) is a 2012 novel by Kuwaiti writer Saud Alsanousi, for which he won the State Prize for Literature in Kuwait in 2012, and the International Prize for Arabic Fiction (known as the Arabic Booker Prize) in 2013, making Alsanousi the youngest Arab writer and first Kuwaiti author to receive this prestigious award.

Set between Kuwait and the Philippines, the novel follows the complex journey of José Mendoza/Issa, the son of a Filipina domestic worker and her wealthy Kuwaiti employer. Struggling with a fragmented identity, José navigates the invisible borders of race, class, faith and belonging, caught between two cultures that each reject part of who he is. His search for identity and acceptance becomes a powerful exploration of class divides, cultural prejudice and the intertwining of faith and culture in Arab societies.

The narrative has since reached international audiences, being translated into fourteen languages, and was adapted into a Kuwaiti television series, Saq Al Bamboo, which premiered during Ramadan 2016 and sparked both high viewership and public debate for its sensitive portrayal of cultural taboos and social divisions.

The novel has been translated into English, Italian, Persian, Turkish, Chinese, Korean, Romanian, Kurdish, Macedonian, Filipino, Somali, Croatian, Malayalam, and Indonesian.

== Awards ==
- Awarded the State Encouragement Award in Literature for the novel The Bamboo Stalk (2012).
- The Bamboo Stalk won the International Prize for Arabic Fiction (IPAF - Arabic Booker) in 2013.
- Awarded the Banipal Prize for Arabic Literary Translation to the English translation of The Bamboo Stalk by Jonathan Wright (2016).
