= Lucy Hawking =

English journalist and novelist (born 1970)

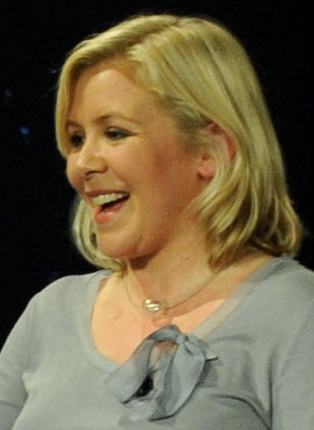
- Hawking at NASA in 2008
- Born: Catherine Lucy Hawking; 2 November 1970 (age 56); England
- Education: University of Oxford; City University of London
- Occupations: Journalist; novelist; educator; philanthropist
- Organisation: National Star College
- Spouse: Alex Smith (m. 1998; div. 2004)
- Children: 1
- Parents: Stephen Hawking (father); Jane Hawking (mother)

Catherine Lucy Hawking (born 2 November 1970) is an English journalist, novelist, educator, and philanthropist. She is the daughter of the theoretical physicist Stephen Hawking and writer Jane Wilde. She lives in London, and is a children's novelist and science educator.

== Early life and education ==
Hawking was born on 2 November 1970 to scientist Stephen Hawking and author Jane (née Wilde). She has two brothers, Robert and Timothy Hawking, and was raised in Cambridge after a few years spent in Pasadena, California, as a child. She attended the Stephen Perse Foundation. As a young adult, she was a carer for her father as his health declined due to motor neuron disease.

Hawking studied French and Russian at the University of Oxford. During her university studies, she spent time in Moscow to focus on her Russian studies. After completing her degree, she studied international journalism at City University of London. There she decided not to make a career of journalism, though she found it to be good writing practice and a way to get into the writing profession.

== Career ==
After university Hawking spent time working as a journalist. She wrote for New York magazine, the Daily Mail, The Telegraph, The Times, the London Evening Standard, and The Guardian. She also worked as a radio journalist.

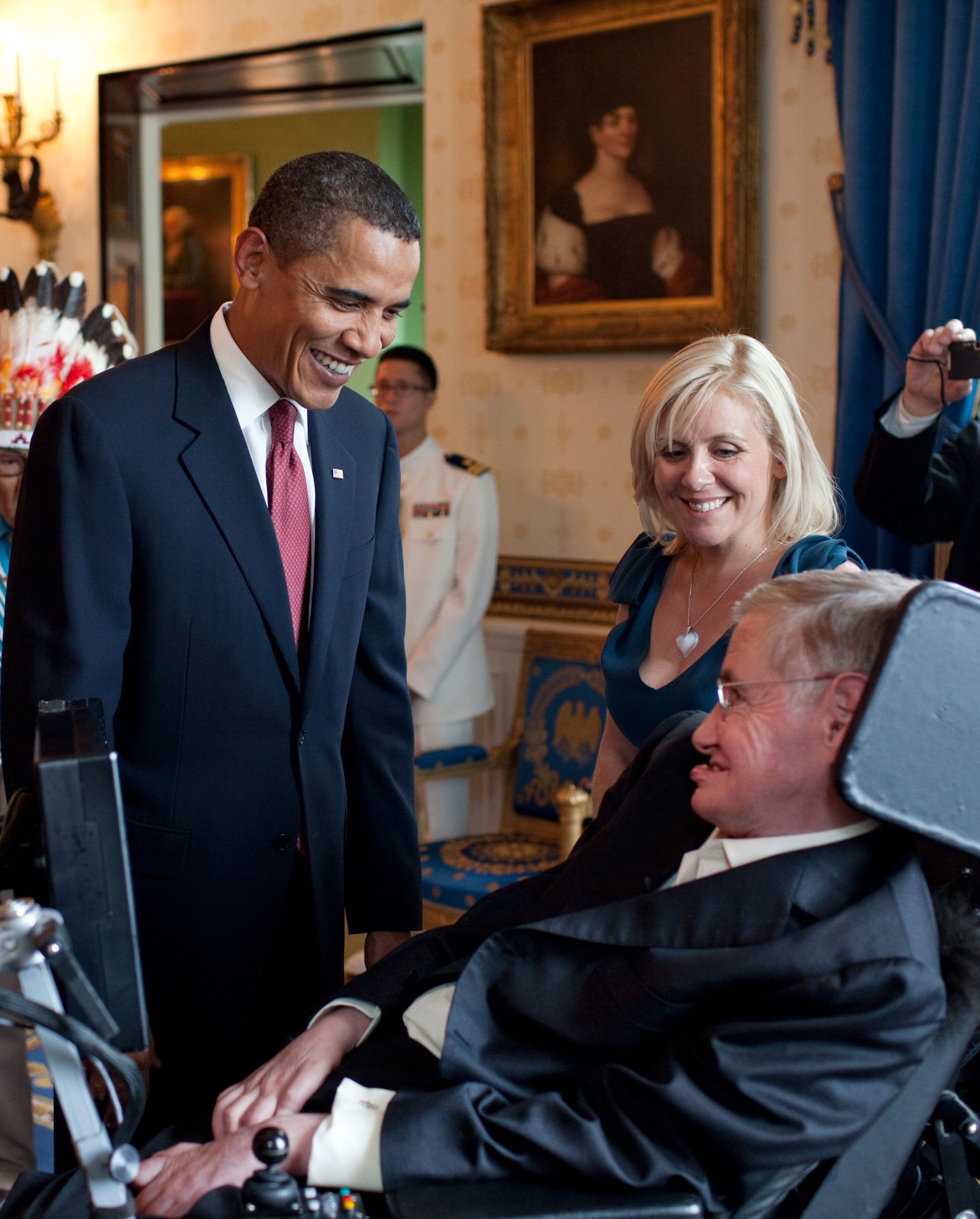
Lucy and Stephen Hawking with U.S. president Barack Obama in the Blue Room of the White House in 2009

Hawking aspired to become an author. Her first two novels were Jaded (2004) and Run for Your Life (2005) (also published as The Accidental Marathon). A few years after these books she transitioned to children's literature, and in 2007 she published George's Secret Key to the Universe, an adventure story about a small boy called George who finds a way to slip through a computer generated portal and travel around the Solar System. This book was written with her father, Stephen Hawking, and his former Ph.D. student, Christophe Galfard. It has been translated into 38 languages and published in 43 countries. Five other books have been published in the series: George's Cosmic Treasure Hunt in 2009, George and the Big Bang in 2011, George and the Unbreakable Code in 2014, George and the Blue Moon in 2016 and George and the Ship of Time in 2018.

In 2015, Hawking and British publisher Curved House Kids were awarded funding from the UK Space Agency to produce an education project as part of astronaut Tim Peake's education outreach. The result was Principia Space Diary, developed with Kristen Harrison at Curved House Kids with expert input from Professor Peter McOwan at Queen Mary University of London. It reached over 60,000 students in the UK and was nominated for a Sir Arthur Clarke Award for Excellence in Space Education by the British Interplanetary Society.

All of Hawking's books and articles centre around the theme of teaching science and education to children. She took an interest in this topic after witnessing one of her son's friends ask her father about black holes at a party. He responded by telling him he would "turn into spaghetti", and the boy was delighted with that answer. This experience shaped her perspective on using methods of entertainment, such as children's literature and adventure films, to engage the new generation on "post-truth" politics and scientific understandings.

She also appeared on the podcast "Hawking—A Literal Genius" and talked about her father and his accomplishments.

== Awards and recognition ==
In April 2008, Hawking participated in NASA's 50th birthday lecture series, contributing a talk on children and science education. Based on her experiences in touring worldwide with George's Secret Key and giving talks on physics and astronomy to children, her lecture highlighted the need to engage children in science at an early age. A few months later, she was a recipient of a Sapio Prize—an Italian award dedicated to innovative researchers—for popularising science worldwide.

In 2010, Arizona State University appointed Hawking writer-in-residence of its 2011 Origins Project.

In 2013, Hawking spoke at the BrainSTEM: Your Future is Now festival at the Perimeter Institute for Theoretical Physics in Waterloo, Ontario, Canada.

In March 2017, Hawking was invited to speak at the Emirates Airline Festival in Dubai. In June, Hawking was recognised at the Amsterdam News Educational Foundation, which honoured her and two other women rising in the field of science.

== Philanthropy ==
Hawking is vice president of the National Star College, an institution dedicated to allowing people with disabilities to realise their potential through personalised learning, transition and lifestyle services, a foundation which provides care and education for young adults with complex and multiple disabilities. She is also a trustee of the Autism Research Trust.

== Personal life ==
Hawking married Alex Mackenzie Smith in 1998. The couple divorced in 2004. She has a son who has autism and has influenced her support for people on the autistic spectrum.
