= Isobel Abulhoul =

Emirati businesswoman

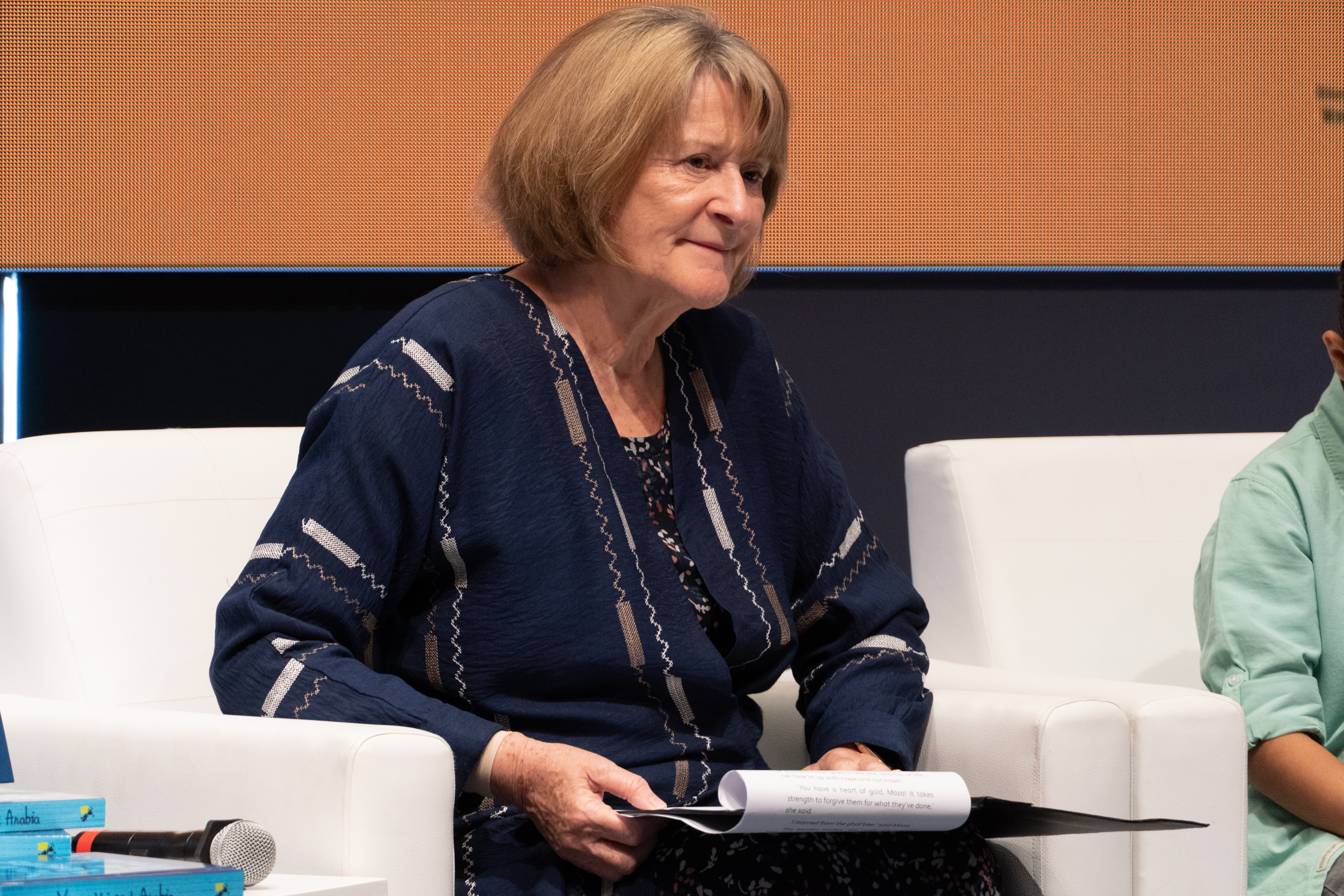

Isobel Abulhoul OBE, is the chief executive officer and trustee of the Emirates Literature Foundation.

Isobel Abulhoul came to Dubai in 1968 and co-founded Magrudy's, a bookshop chain, in 1975. In 2008, she was founding director of the Emirates Airline Festival of Literature.

In 2013, Sheikh Mohammed Bin Rashid Al Maktoum, Vice President and Prime Minister of the UAE and Ruler of Dubai, founded the Emirates Literature Foundation, naming Isobel as one of the trustees on the Board. In addition, Isobel also holds the position of chief executive officer of the foundation. She is also Director of the Board for the Mohammed Bin Rashid Library.

She co-hosts ‘Talking of Books’ on Dubai Eye 103.8 FM.

== Awards ==
- Awarded the Cultural Personality of the Year by Sheikh Sultan bin Muhammad Al-Qasimi, the Ruler of Sharjah, in 2010
- Appointed an OBE by Queen Elizabeth of Great Britain in 2012
- Named Cultural Icon of UAE[13][12][5][13] by The 3rd Petrochem GR8! Women Awards - Middle East 2013
- Selected as one of the most influential Brits in the Arabian Business UAE Brits List and the most inspirational woman living in the UAE by Middle East Business
- Awarded the Distinguished Culture Award at the 21st Al Owais Creative Award
- Named Trustee on board of International Prize for Arabic Fiction
- Special Cultural Award from the Al Owais Creativity Awards 2013
- ‘Imprint of Thought’ Award at the Watani Emarat Humanitarian Work Award ceremony 2013
- Arabian Business’ the Most Influential Woman Award 2013
- Femina Unstoppable Woman Award 2015
- Arabian Business' 100 Smartest People In The UAE
- Isobel accepted the UAE Pioneers Award 2016 for the Emirates Literature Foundation, which was honoured as best not-for-profit organisation to encourage reading
