= Myrna Ayad =

Dubai writer

- Occupations: Art Advisor and Independent Arts Writer.
- Notable work: Sheikh Zayed: An Eternal Legacy Dubai Wonder Contemporary Kingdom: The Saudi Art Scene Now
- Honours: In 2017, nominated among the 100 Most Powerful Arab Businesswomen in Forbes In 2018,50 Most Influential Women in the Arab World in Arabian Business.
- Website: www.myrnaayad.com

Myrna Ayad (Arabic: ميرنا عياد) is a Dubai-based cultural strategist, art advisor and independent arts writer focusing on visual art and culture from the Arab world, Iran and Turkey. She was director of Art Dubai from 2016 to 2018 and prior to that, editor of Canvas magazine. In 2018, Ayad established her own consultancy focused on cultural strategy.

== Career ==
Myrna Ayad was born in Beirut and moved to the United Arab Emirates in 1982. From 2007 to 2015, she was editor of Canvas, a magazine focused on visual art from the Middle East, where she also ran the production of Canvas Daily newspapers, published during Art Dubai and Abu Dhabi Art as well as supplements art books for clients such as Bulgari, Van Cleef & Arpels and Christie's. She is also the editor of Contemporary Kingdom: The Saudi Art Scene Now, published in 2014 and which surveys the artists, patrons, cultural institutions, and initiatives that comprise the Saudi art scene.

Between 2015 and 2016, Ayad wrote prolifically for a variety of publications, including The New York Times, CNN Online, The National, The Art Newspaper, Artforum, Artsy, Artnet, and Wallpaper*. She has reviewed the work and exhibitions of artists including Mona Hatoum, Abdulrahman Katanani, and Elias Zayat, among others, and covered the regional art scene including features the Marrakech Biennale, Art Dubai, Abu Dhabi Art, and TMoCA for which she interviewed former Iranian empress Farah Diba Pahlavi.

In April 2016, Ayad was appointed director of Art Dubai, the foremost international art fair in the Middle East, North Africa, and South Asia’s (MENASA’s). She launched the Art Dubai Modern Symposium, featuring talks and presentations about the lives, works, and cultural impact of 20th century masters from the Middle East, South Asia, and Africa.

In 2018, Ayad established her own art consultancy, specializing in art advisory, cultural strategy, and publishing. Among the projects she worked on is The Art of Dialogue which presented a series of cultural debates engaging intellectuals, artists and participants such as Noura Al Kaabi, the UAE Minister of Culture and Youth. Ayad is curator of LIFE WTR Arabia, a premium PH-balanced water by Pepsico and which features commissioned artworks on its label. Also, she is the author of Remembering the Artist, a monthly series for The National that tackles the lives and work of pioneering modernists from the Middle East, North Africa and South Asia. Among the artists featured in the series are Pail Guiragossian, Behjat Sadr, Adam Henein, Fahrelnissa Zeid, Hassan Al Glaoui, Helen Khal and Naziha Selim.

Ayad authored Sheikh Zayed: An Eternal Legacy focused on the late ruler of the Emirates, Sheikh Zayed bin Sultan Al Nahyan; and Dubai Wonder, both released in 2021 by the publishing house, Assouline. She is also advisor to Riyadh's Misk Art Institute, serving as a jurist for the Misk Art Grant and as copyeditor of the Art Library: Discovering Arab Artists in collaboration with Rizzoli Libri.

== Awards and honors ==
- In 2017, she was nominated among the 100 Most Powerful Arab Businesswomen in Forbes.
- In 2018, she ranked among the 50 Most Influential Women in the Arab World in Arabian Business.

== Selected publications ==
- Sheikh Zayed: An Eternal Legacy. Assouline, 2021.
- Dubai Wonder. Assouline, 2021.
- Contemporary Kingdom: The Saudi Art Scene Now. Canvas Central, 2014.
