= Benedict du Boulay =

British computer scientist

- Education: University of Edinburgh (PhD)
- Known for: Psychology of programming Cognitive tutors
- Scientific career
- Fields: Computer science Cognitive psychology Educational technology
- Workplaces: University of Sussex
- Thesis: (1978)

Benedict du Boulay is a British computer scientist and one of the pioneers in the area of application of Artificial Intelligence to education. He is currently Emeritus Professor of Artificial Intelligence in the School of Engineering and Informatics at the University of Sussex and visiting professor at University College London.

== Biography ==
du Boulay gained a BSc in physics from Imperial College London (1966) and a PGCE from the University of Zambia (1968). He completed his PhD in 1978 on Logo in the Department of Artificial Intelligence at the University of Edinburgh. He is currently Emeritus Professor of Artificial Intelligence at the University of Sussex.

His responsibilities in Sussex included Dean of Cognitive and Computing Sciences (1994–1998) as well as Dean of science and Technology (2002–2009). His community service to the field of AI in Education included being a President (2015–2017) of the International Society for Artificial Intelligence in Education and an Associate Editor of its International Journal of Artificial Intelligence in Education.

== Research ==
du Bolulay edited/wrote 12 books and wrote over 190 papers. His most recent book is Handbook of AI in Education.

== Publications ==
- Benedict du Boulay and Riichiro Mizoguchi (eds.) Proceedings of AI-ED'97, 8th World Conference on Artificial Intelligence in Education, Kobe, Japan, 18–22 August 1997, IOS, 1997
- Christopher Thornton and Benedict Du Boulay (eds.) Artificial Intelligence: Strategies, Applications, and Models Through Search. Amacom Books, 1999.
- Carmel Kent and Ben Du Boulay, AI for Learning. CRC Press, 2022
- Benedict du Boulay, Antonia Mitrovic and Kalina Yacef (eds.): Handbook of Artificial Intelligence in Education. Edward Elgar, 2023.
