= Ahmed Masoud (writer) =

Palestinian writer and academic (born 1981)

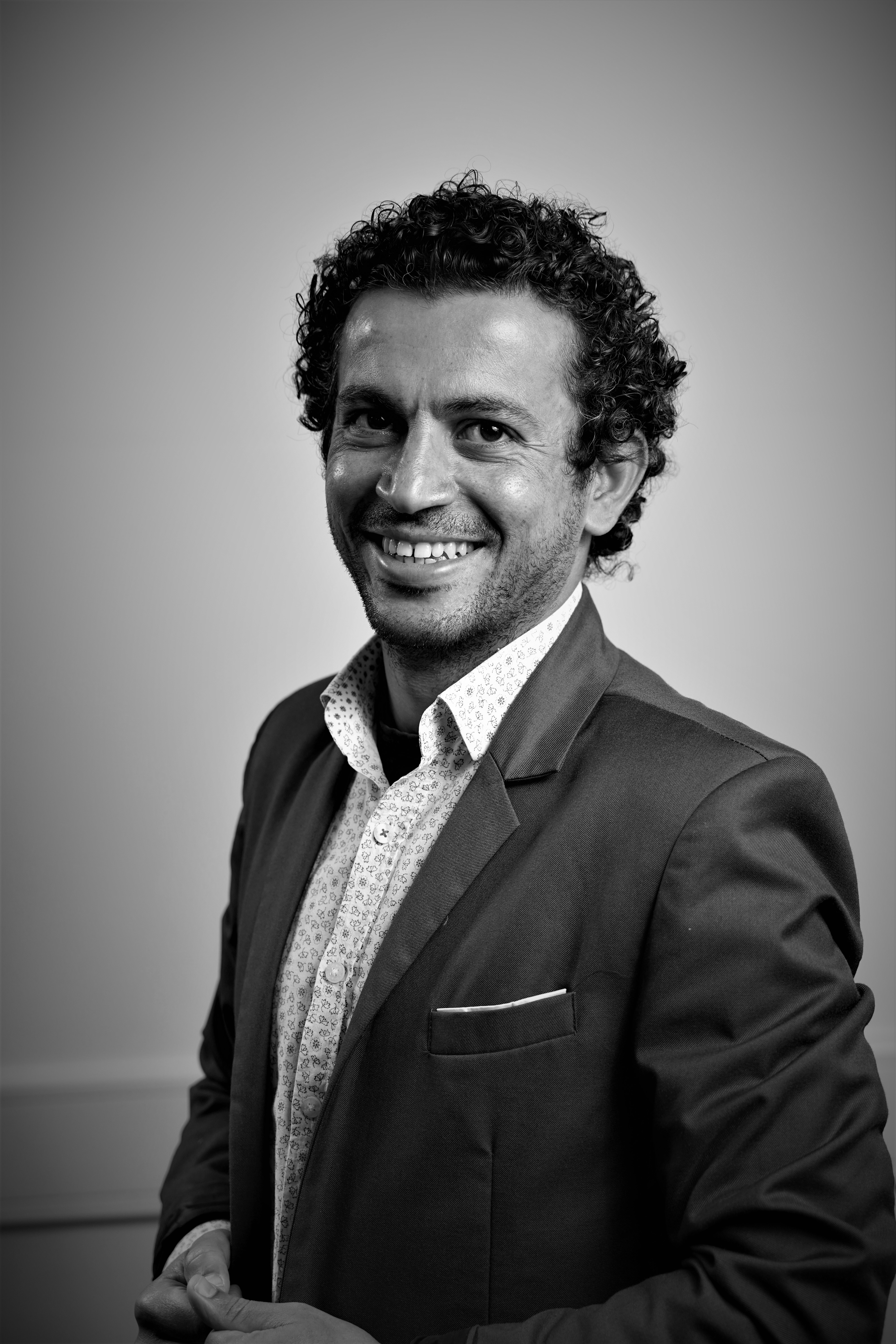
- Masoud in 2022
- Born: 1981 (age 44–45); Gaza City, Palestine
- Education: Al-Azhar University; London Metropolitan University; Goldsmiths, University of London
- Occupations: Writer, director and poet
- Years active: 2005–present
- Website: www.ahmedmasoud.co.uk

Ahmed Masoud (born 1981) is a Palestinian and British writer, theatre maker, and academic based in London. He wrote plays including The Shroud Maker (2017), Camouflage (2020), Passports, Jinn, Mo Salah and Other Complicated Things (2023) and Application 39 (2025) and the novels Vanished: The Mysterious Disappearance of Mustafa Ouda (2015) and Come What May (2022). He founded the Al Zaytouna dance company and PalArt Collective.

== Early life ==
Masoud grew up in Jabalia Refugee Camp. His paternal family were originally from the village of Deir Sneid, and his grandfather had owned a stone house and farms in Jerusalem prior to the Nakba. With an interest in bands such as Queen and writers like Charles Dickens, Masoud learned English at a young age and went on to study English literature at Al-Azhar University. When aged 20, in 2002, he moved to London. He graduated with a Bachelor of Arts (BA) and a Master of Arts (MA) in English literature from London Metropolitan University. He went on to complete his PhD in comparative literature at Goldsmiths, University of London.

== Career ==
In 2005, Masoud founded the dabke dance company Al Zaytouna, partially to fund his studies, through which he directed an adaptation of Ghassan Kanafani's Returning to Haifa (2006) and Unto the Breach (2012), inspired by Shakespeare's Henry V. In 2008, Masoud published a chapter in Britain and the Muslim World: A historical perspective. The following year, he collaborated with Justin Butcher on the play Go to Gaza, Drink the Sea at the Theatro Technis.

On a grant awarded by the Arts Council in 2014, Masoud wrote the play Walaa: Loyalty about the Syrian refugee crisis. The play, directed by Richard Shannon, premiered at the New Diorama Theatre. His following play The Shroud Maker with Amnesty International, a satirical play about the titular woman named Hajja Souad, went on a tour of the UK. Also in 2015, Masoud's debut novel Vanished: The Mysterious Disappearance of Mustafa Ouda was published via Rimal Books. The novel was shortlisted for a 2015 Palestine Book Award, awarded by Middle East Monitor.

To mark the 50th anniversary of Israel's military occupation of Gaza, Masoud reunited with Amnesty International for his dark comedy play Camouflage, which was put on in May 2017.

The Shroud Maker was once again staged in 2017 at the Royal Academy of Dramatic Art (RADA) followed by a UK tour in 2018. It was also shown at Liverpool's Arab Arts Festival and workshopped in Manchester.

Masoud has been a lecturer at the University of the Arts London, as well as head of international partnership development at Oxford Brookes University for nine years and, as of 2019, head of Regent's University London's international partnerships office. He joined the University of Plymouth's Displacement Studies Research Network. He was selected to be the writer in residence at the 2019 Bristol Palestine Film Festival.

In 2022, Masoud published his second novel Come What May. He also founded the PalArt Collective and Festival initiative. Masoud collaborated with slam poet Farah Chamma on the experimental show Passports, Mo Salah, Jinn and Other Complicated Things.

Masoud's play The Shroud Maker returned to the stage for the 2024 Edinburgh Fringe Festival. He also contributed to Cutting the Tightrope: The Divorce of Politics from Art, a collection of short plays written in response to censorship surrounding Palestine in the arts. Masoud then adapted his 2018 short story Application 39 for the stage, which premiered at the Theatro Technis in May 2025; the futuristic satire imagines a scenario in which Gaza accidentally wins a bid to host the 2048 Summer Olympic Games.

== Personal life ==
In 2023, the IDF destroyed the Jabalia cemetery where Masoud's father was buried. In 2024, Masoud's brother Khalid lost his leg and eventually succumbed to his injuries, leaving behind his young children. In May 2024, Masoud called on Parliament to offer a visa route for families of British nationals stuck in Gaza similar to the route offered to Ukrainian families. He expressed concern for his sister Hind and her baby. In 2025, Masoud lost his sister-in-law and nephew.

== Bibliography ==
=== Novels ===
- Vanished: The Mysterious Disappearance of Mustafa Ouda (2015)
- Come What May (2022)

=== Plays ===
- Go to Gaza, Drink the Sea (2009)
- Walaa: Loyalty (2014)
- The Shroud Maker (2017)
- Application 39 (2025)

=== Short stories and essays ===
- "Race & Identity in Early Palestinian Literature of Resistance" in Britain and the Muslim World: Historical Perspectives (2010) (edited by Gerald McLean)
- "Application 39" in Palestine + 100 (2019)

=== Audio ===
- Escape from Gaza (2011) for BBC Radio 4
