= Ahmad Al Shugairi =

Saudi TV personality

Ahmad Al Shugairi – أحمد الشقيري
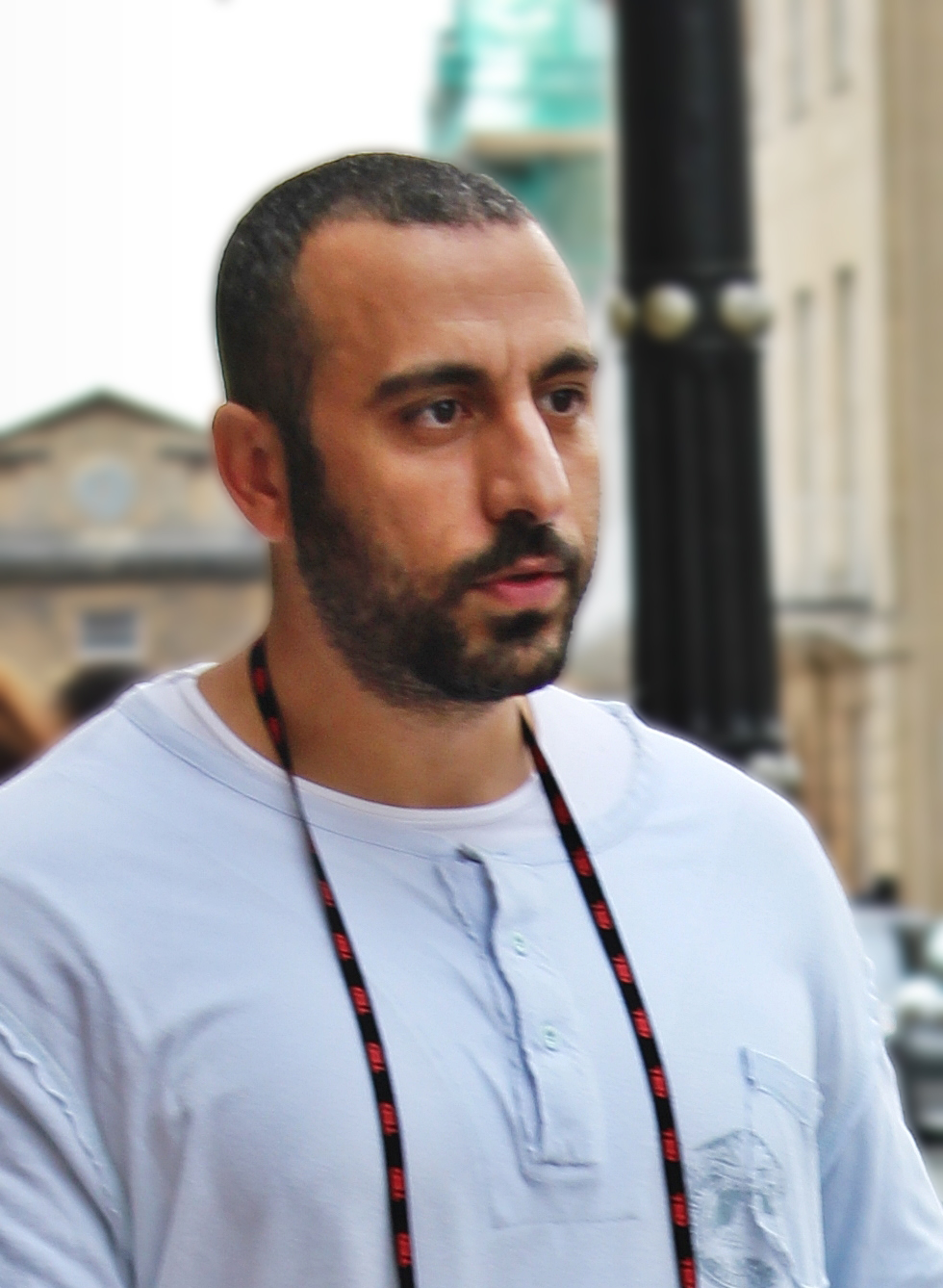
- Alshugairi in July 2010
- Born: Ahmad Mazen Alshugairi; 6 June 1973 (age 53); Jeddah, Saudi Arabia
- Occupation: Media Personality
- Years active: 2002–present
- Spouse: Rola Dashisha (m. 1999)

Ahmad Mazin Alshugairi (Arabic: أحمد مازن الشقيري; June 6, 1973, in Jeddah, Saudi Arabia), is a Saudi Arabian media personality. He is best known for his program Khawatir that spanned from 2005 to 2015, which was a critical and commercial success within the Arab world and Saudi Arabia in particular. He has notable social media exposure with 18.2 million followers (as of October 2019), ranked in the world top 100 as well as #1 in Saudi Arabia in 2015 on Twitter.

== Biography ==
=== Personal life ===
Alshugairi was born in the city of Jeddah, Kingdom of Saudi Arabia. After graduating from Manarat high school in Jeddah, he moved to the United States where he received his B.A. in Management Systems California State University-Long Beach, and an MBA in Business at University of California, Berkeley.

In 1996, he returned to Saudi Arabia and started working in his father's business.

His father Mazen Alshugairi, his mother Affaf Ali. Ahmad Alshugairi married twice; upon divorcing his first wife Yasmine, he married his second, Rola Dashisha, who is also his costume designer in Khawatir 5 & 6. The couple have two boys named Yousof and Ibrahim.

== Career ==
Starting his media career in 2002, in the TV program, Yalla ya Shabab (Come on, Youth), If he were Among us and a second program, A Travel with Sheikh Hamza Yusuf on MBC. He is the host of Khawatir, an annual TV show that aired during Ramadan from 2005 to 2015. He won the US$1 million Sheikh Mohammad Bin Rashid Al Maktoum Knowledge Award in 2015.

He has many publications such as:

- Khawatir Books, which essentially encompass the contents of the Khawatir television series in a published book.
- Khawatir from Japan, in reference to season 5 of Khawatir that was from Japan.
- My Trip with Gandhi, he talks in this book about his own experience in this life.
- "Forty" a book that talks about Ahmad's 40 top favorite things like 40 favorite books 40 favorite verses in Quran, etc.
- "Seen" that was released in 2021.Named after the letter that begins "so’al" which means question.

== Critical reception ==
Twenty Youth magazine (مجلة شباب 20) in Emirates placed him the first in its list as the most influential in the Arab world. He also won the best youth media personality in the third youth media forum in Jordan, and he was placed 143 in a list of 500 of the most influential Arab figures in the Arab world according to a survey published by Arabian Business magazine.
