= CS4FN =

- Editor: Paul Curzon
- Categories: Computer magazine
- Frequency: Six-monthly
- Publisher: Queen Mary University of London
- Country: United Kingdom
- Language: English
- Website: www.cs4fn.org
- ISSN: 1754-3657

CS4FN (Computer Science for Fun) is a UK-based magazine on computer science aimed at school students, posted free to subscribing schools in the UK. It is produced by Paul Curzon, Peter McOwan and staff from the School of Electronic Engineering and Computer Science (EECS), Queen Mary University of London, England, with initial support from the EPSRC. The magazine is also supported by the British Computer Society, Microsoft, ARM and Intel as well as EECS. It is printed twice a year and has an associated website with additional articles.

== ISSN information ==
- ISSN 1754-3657 (print edition)
- ISSN 1754-3665 (electronic edition)
