= Afra Atiq =

Emirati spoken word poet

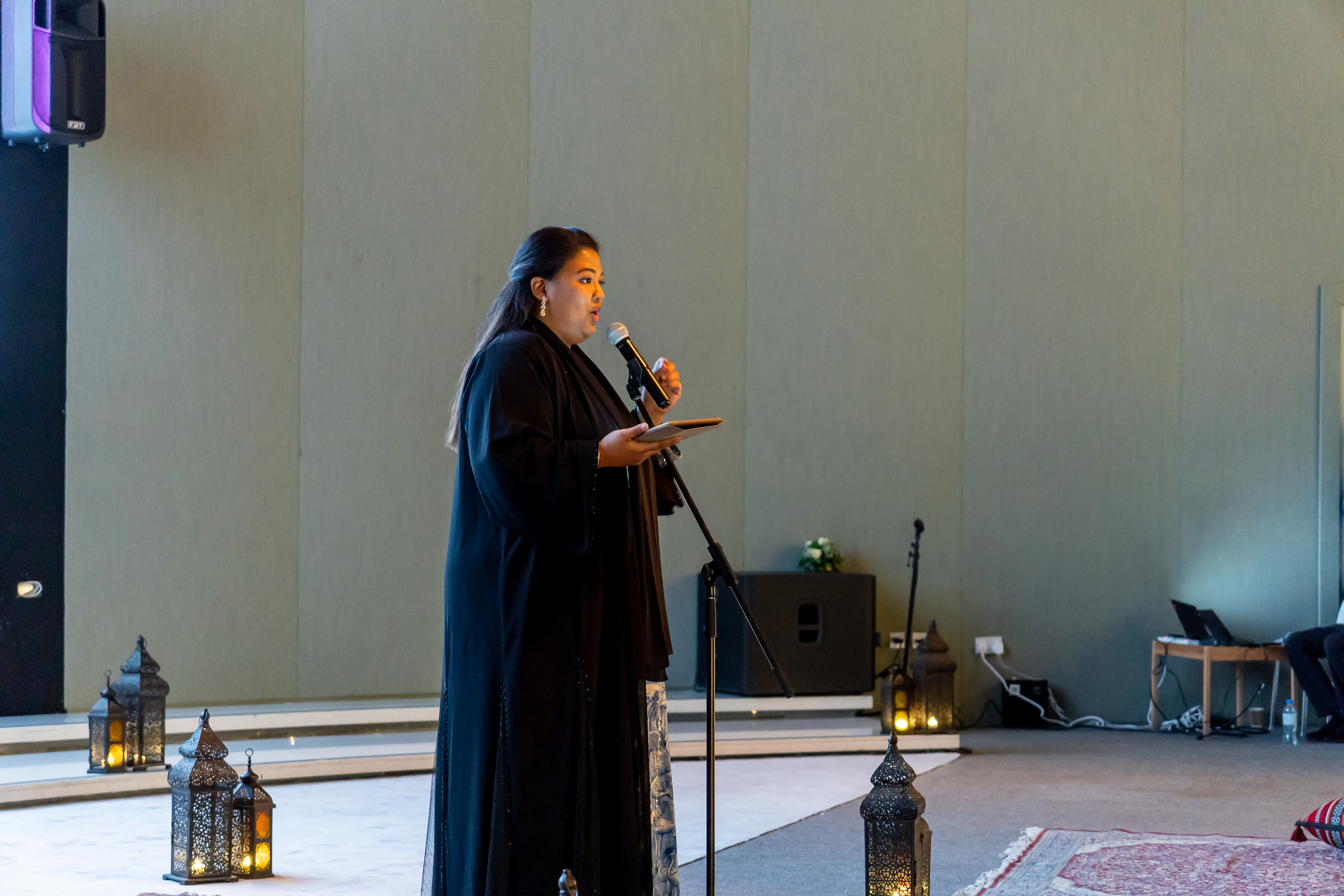
- Born: Dubai, United Arab Emirates
- Education: United Arab Emirates University
- Occupation: Poet
- Writing career
- Language: Arabic, English, French
- Years active: 2000–present
- Genre: Spoken word
- Notable awards: The Special Achievement Award at Arab Women Awards, 2018; The Abu Dhabi Music and Art Foundation Creativity Award, 2017
- Website: www.afraatiq.com

Afra Atiq (Arabic: عفراء عتيق) is an Emirati spoken word poet who was born in the United Arab Emirates to an Emirati father and a Japanese-American mother. Atiq holds a PhD in Media and Creative Industries from the United Arab Emirates University and is the co-founder of the Untitled Chapters, a collective of female Emirati writers. Now, she works as a full-time poet. In 2015, She was named the "Best Performer" by Rooftop Rhythms and won the Abu Dhabi Music and Art Foundation Creativity award for her poem "An Open Letter to Cancer" in 2017.

== Education and career ==
Afra Atiq was born and raised in the city of Dubai in the United Arab Emirates. She studied at United Arab Emirates University, where she obtained her master's degree in International Relations and Diplomacy, and more recently her PhD in Media and Creative Industries. In 2017, Atiq published her study in the International Journal of Research in Humanities and Social Sciences. She also conducted a number of social research on literature and education. At a young age, Afra Atiq started writing poems in different languages such as Arabic, English, and French. In her poems, she highlights different topics including self-acceptance, grief, identity, and heritage. Over the past few years, Atiq has presented her work on various regional and international platforms including the Emirates Airline Literature Festival, STEP Music Festival, Sheraa Sharjah, TED-X Fujairah, and the Art Center of New York University in Abu Dhabi. Afra Atiq has shared the stage with a number of poets including Carol Ann Duffy (Poet Laureate), Imitiaz Dhaker, Farah Chamma, and the youngest Poetry World Slam Champion (in 2012), Harry Baker. In 2017, her poem "An Open Letter to Cancer" won the Abu Dhabi Music and Art Foundation Creativity award, making her the first Emirati poet to win this award since its establishment in 1996. She is also the first Emirati to perform at Nuyorican Poet's Cafe in New York, the Bowery Poetry Club, and has won the PoetsNY poetry slam in New York.

== Poetry collections ==
- I Wrote Poems
- A Good Punch
- Numbers
- 2 AM
- An Open Letter to Cancer
- A Love Letter
- Cher Moi
- Not Your Typical

== Awards ==
- 2018: Won the Special Achievement Award at Arab Women Awards.
- 2017: Won the Abu Dhabi Music and Art Foundation Creativity Award.
- 2015–2016: Named as the "Best Performer" by Rooftop Rhythms.

== See also ==
- Eman Al Yousuf
- Dubai Abulhoul
- Nadia Al Najjar
