= Saud Alsanousi =

Kuwaiti novelist, playwright and journalist (born 1981)

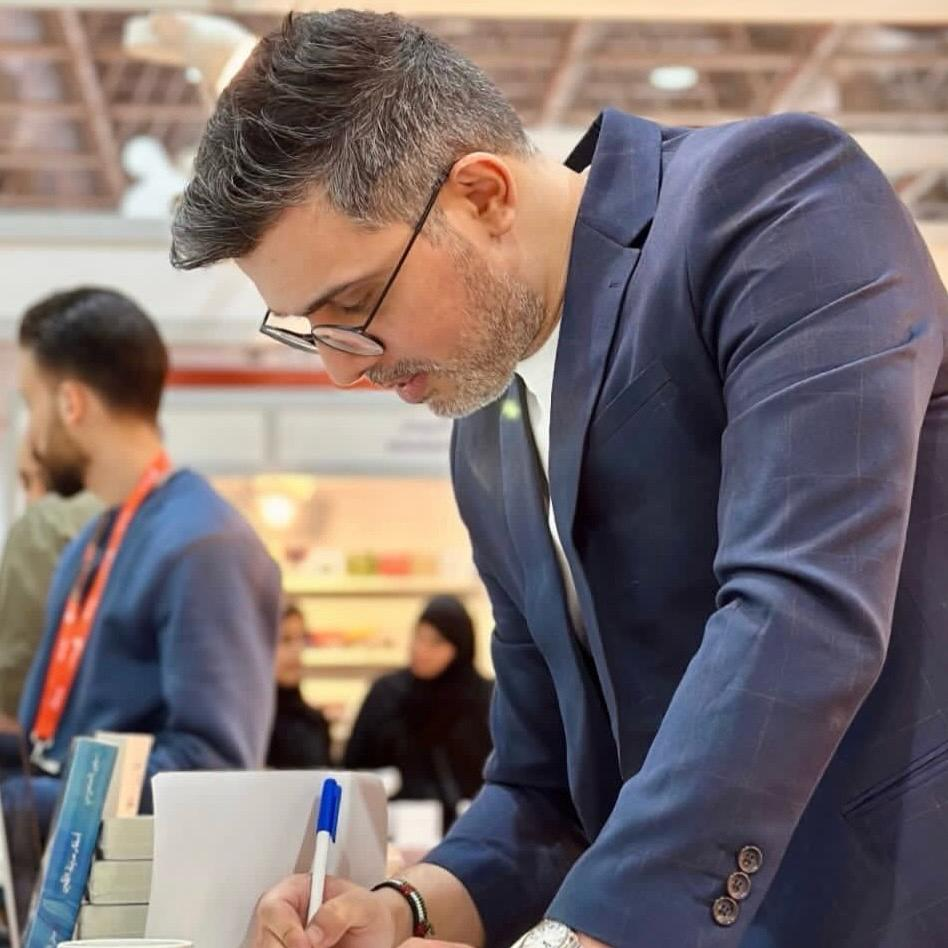
- Alsanousi at a book signing
- Born: 1981 (age 44–45); Kuwait
- Occupation: Novelist
- Writing career
- Genres: Realism, Magical Realism
- Notable works: The Bamboo Stalk, Mama Hissa's Mice, The Scrolls of Mud City (Trilogy)
- Notable awards: State of Kuwait Award (2012), International Prize for Arabic Fiction (2013)

Saud Alsanousi (Arabic: سعود السنعوسي, born 1981) is a Kuwaiti novelist, playwright and journalist who has established himself as a literary voice in the Arab world despite his relatively young age. His works offer reflections on Kuwait's society, culture and identity, with his novels - translated into more than 14 languages - earning him regional and international recognition.

In 2010, Alsanousi made his literary debut with The Prisoner of Mirrors, which won the Laila al-Othman Prize, an award that recognizes promising emerging writers. He gained further recognition by winning first prize for his short story The Bonsai and the Old Man in the 'Stories on Air' competition organized by Al-Arabi magazine and BBC Arabic in 2011. In 2012, his novel The Bamboo Stalk earned him the State of Kuwait Award for Literature, and in 2013, he became the youngest winner of the International Prize for Arabic Fiction, commonly known as the "Arabic Booker". In 2016, a Kuwaiti TV series based on the novel, titled "Saq Al Bamboo", was produced. Alsanousi’s later works, Mama Hissa's Mice (2015), Pigeons of the House (2017), and Saleha's Camel (2019), were all shortlisted for the Sheikh Zayed Book Award. His latest novel, The Scrolls of Mud City (2023, 2024), is an epic historical fiction trilogy set in Kuwait, blending myths, beliefs, and narratives to depict Kuwaiti society and the lives of visionaries, pearl divers, merchants, and traders during a defining era in the nation's history.

Through his novels, Alsanousi delves into the complexities of Kuwait's history and society, blending storytelling with efforts to preserve his country's cultural heritage and resist the erosion of memory. His work offers a deep exploration of the social fabric of Kuwait with nuance and honesty, shedding light on societal contradictions and the intertwining of religion and culture, while challenging rigid norms, inherited beliefs, and deeply rooted prejudices. In doing so, his narratives offer a window into the nation's identity, culture and history as he attempts to mend both the past and the present of his beloved Kuwait.

In addition to his six novels, Alsanousi has contributed to Kuwait's cultural scene as a writer-in-residence at the Sheikh Jaber Al-Ahmad Cultural Centre, where he adapted the celebrated Memoirs of a Sailor musical (2019) and wrote the play New Jibla (2020). His work has appeared in various publications, including Al-Watan newspaper and Al-Arabi, Al-Kuwait, and Abwab magazines. He is represented by Laura Susijn at the Susijn Agency Ltd'

== Literary perspective ==
Alsanousi has delivered several literary testimonies at various literary conferences, outlining his approach to writing and his relationship with it. He views writing, especially the novel, not as a luxury or artistic indulgence, but as a necessity. He does not write to entertain the reader, but to resist forgetting, to endure the anxiety of existence, and to understand the world with all its contradictions and unanswered questions. He believes that fiction, through its imaginative power, is capable of expressing the truth more profoundly than reality itself. To him, the novel is the most expansive literary form, capable of absorbing history, religion, psychology, philosophy, human emotion, and all other forms of knowledge and art, then reimagining them within a narrative space broad enough to encompass the full depth of human experience.

For Alsanousi, imagination is not merely a literary device; it is a refuge, a boundless freedom that real life does not offer. Through the imaginative realm of fiction, he has lived through his characters and reached parts of himself he could never access without writing. After completing his trilogy The Scrolls of Mud City, describes himself as having lived on paper lives he never lived outside its pages. He embodied the weak and the strong, the killer and the victim, the believer and the atheist, the man and the woman, the child and the elder, the ant, the bird, and the tree - summoning through them diverse spiritual, social, and philosophical experiences that granted him a deeper understanding of what it means to be human.

Alsanousi writes fiction to converse with death, to revive memory, and to craft a narrative homeland that preserves the details of Kuwait he fears may be forgotten. He believes that when a writer writes, they are not merely describing the world, they are trying to mend the fractures within themselves. He says: "I do not write because I understand the world, but because I do not, and I want to understand. I do not understand death, so I write to bring the dead to life. I write so that I may not die."

His writing is marked by a reflective, introspective style that blends philosophical depth with sensuous, emotionally rich language and vivid imagery. He uses narrative not merely as a storytelling tool, but as a mode of being. His influences are evident in his admiration for novelists who see fiction as a home for both the self and the other, and in his belief in Milan Kundera's assertion: "The characters in a novel are the unrealized possibilities of the author."

== Works ==
=== In fiction ===
- Prisoner of Mirrors'(2010), novel.
- The Bamboo Stalk (2012), novel. Translated to English by: Jonathan Wright.
- Mama Hissa’s Mice (2015), novel. Translated to English by: Sawad Hussain.
- The Pigeons of the House (2017), novel.
- Saleha’s Camel (2019), novella.
- The Scrolls of Mud City, a trilogy:
1. The Cloak (2023)
2. The Dive (2023)
3. The Yellowbar Angelfish (2024)
- The Night of the Tailor’s Execution (2025), play.

=== In theatre ===
- Memoirs of a Sailor, musical play (2019)

Based on the musical operetta "Memoirs of a Sailor" by poet Mohammed Al-Fayez and composer Ghannam Al-Dikan, with the participation of singer Shadi Al-Khaleej. Directed by Tama Matheson and produced by Sheikh Jaber Al-Ahmad Cultural Centre.

- New Jibla, stage play (2020)

Featuring Saad Al-Faraj and Abdulrahman Al-Aql alongside a group of stars. Directed by Julian Webber and produced by Sheikh Jaber Al-Ahmad Cultural Centre.

- The Night of the Tailor's Execution - Printed Book (2025).

=== In lyrics ===
- Ana Insan (I Am Human) - theme song of The Bamboo Stalk series. Sung and composed by Abadi Al-Johar (2016).
- Praise Be to Him Who Sent Goodness to My Country - performed by the ensemble of Sheikh Jaber Al-Ahmad Cultural Centre.
- The Anthem of Nations, sung by Abdulaziz Al-Mesbah, composed by Dr. Ahmad Al-Salhi (2024).

== Awards and nominations ==
- Recipient of the Laila Al-Othman Award for Youth Creativity in Short Story and Novel (4th edition) for the novel "Prisoner of Mirrors" (2010).
- First place winner in the “Stories on Air” competition organized by Al Arabi magazine in collaboration with BBC Arabic Radio, for the short story "The Bonsai and the Old Man" (2011).
- Awarded the State Encouragement Award in Literature for the novel "The Bamboo Stalk" (2012).
- His novel "The Bamboo Stalk" won the International Prize for Arabic Fiction (IPAF - Arabic Booker) in 2013.
- Named Cultural Personality of the Year - Mohammed Al-Banki Award, Kingdom of Bahrain (2016).
- Selected to represent Kuwait in the GCC Creatives Honoring Ceremony held in Riyadh, alongside composer Ibrahim Al-Soula (2016).
- His novel "Mama Hissa’s Mice" was longlisted for the Sheikh Zayed Book Award (2016–2017).
- His novel “The Pigeons of the House” was shortlisted for the Sheikh Zayed Book Award (2018–2019).
- "The Bamboo Stalk" was selected among the Top 100 Arabic Novels by the British magazine Banipal (2018).
- His novella "Saleha’s Camel" was longlisted for the Sheikh Zayed Book Award (2019–2020).
- His trilogy "The Scrolls of Mud City" was shortlisted for the 19th edition of the Sheikh Zayed Book Award (2024–2025).
- Winner of the Kuwaiti Writers Association Award for the trilogy “The Scrolls of Mud City” (2025).

== Collaboration ==
Saud Alsanousi has maintained a long-standing creative collaboration with Kuwaiti visual artist Meshail AlFaisal who has designed the covers for most of his published novels.

AlFaisal's artwork is distinguished by surreal, emotionally charged figures with exaggerated facial features, often reflecting themes of identity, inner conflict, and cultural dissonance - motifs central to Alsanousi’s narratives. Her visual language merges modernist aesthetics with symbols rooted in Gulf heritage, employing layered compositions and introspective settings to evoke a psychological and cultural depth. Their collaboration stands out in the Arab literary scene for establishing a cohesive visual identity across Alsanousi’s publications - an uncommon approach in regional publishing - and is recognized for visually complementing the emotional and thematic complexity of his work.
