= Arabian Business =

Emirati business magazine

- Cover of the May 30, 2010 edition
- Editor at Large: Matthew Amlot
- Staff writers: Edward Liamzon
- Categories: Business; News; Opinion; Analysis
- Frequency: Weekly
- Circulation: 23,352 (July – December 2012)
- Publisher: ITP Media Group
- First issue: 21 January 2001; 25 years ago
- Country: United Arab Emirates
- Language: English; Arabic
- Website: arabianbusiness.com

Arabian Business (AB) is a weekly business magazine published in Dubai and focusing on global and regional news analysis. The brand is aimed at the English and Arabic-speaking communities and is published in both languages.

Its circulation figures for October–December 2007 were given as 20,468 copies. The audited circulation of the weekly was 23,016 copies for the last six months of 2011. For the period of July – December 2012 the audited circulation of the weekly was 23,352 copies. According to Similar web, website accesses as of 2024 were more than a million per month.

== Controversy ==
In 2017, the online and print version of the magazine was suspended for a month in the UAE by Dubai authorities over false news allegations after it published a report stating that courts in Dubai were in the process of liquidating dozens of failed real estate projects. As the article was published during the Qatar diplomatic crisis, the report was picked up by publications in Qatar, attracting the ire of Emirati authorities. The magazine soon deleted the online article and posted an apology online stating that the piece was related to projects dating from 2010 that are now outdated.

== See also ==
- Gulf Business
