= Christophe Galfard =

French physicist and writer, PhD student of Stephen Hawking

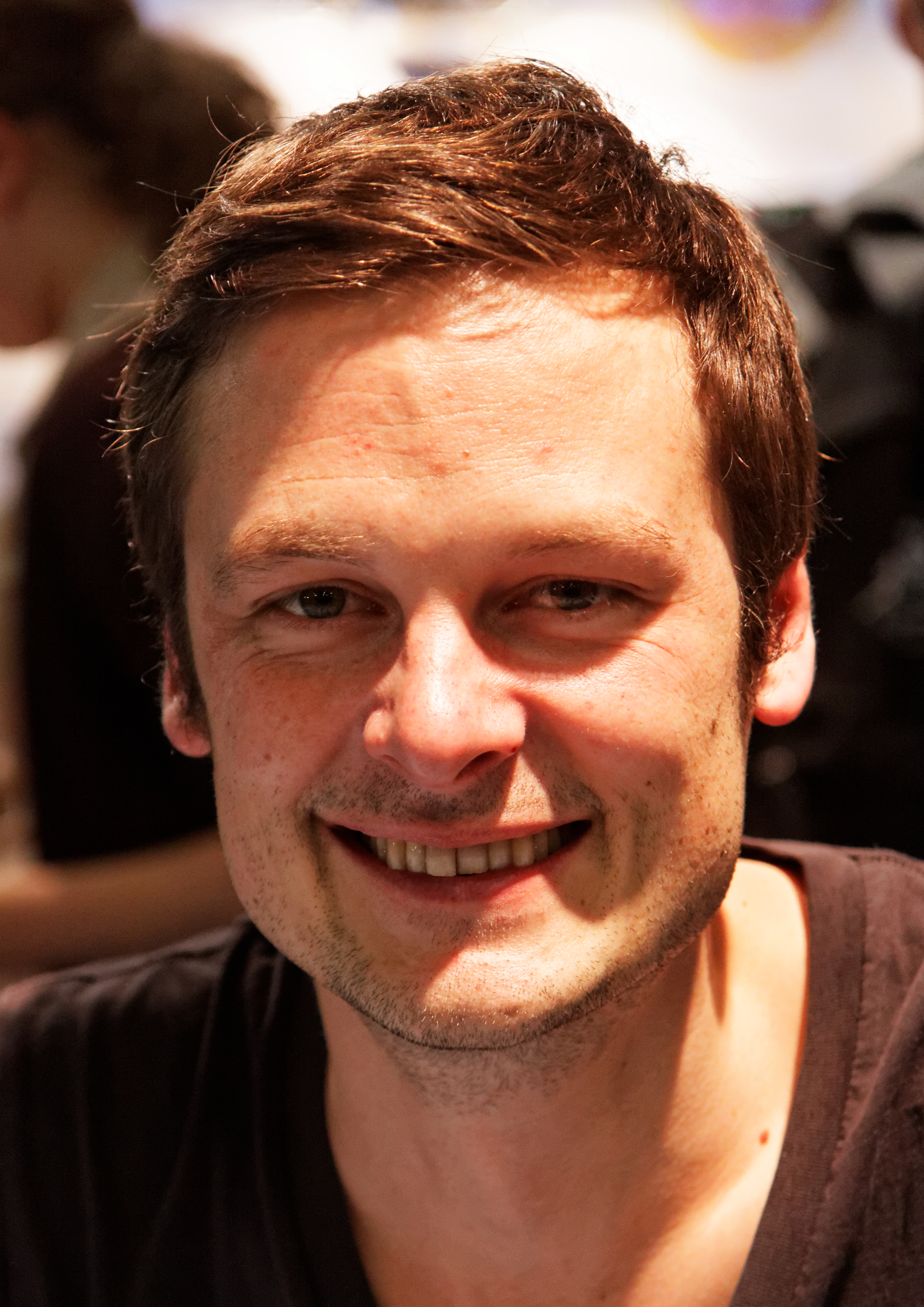
- Galfard in 2012
- Born: March 30, 1976 (age 50); Paris
- Education: École Centrale Paris; University of Cambridge
- Scientific career
- Fields: Theoretical physics

Christophe Galfard (born 1976 in Paris, France) is a French physicist and writer.

== Biography ==
After graduating from the École Centrale Paris in 1999 and specializing in theoretical physics, he then obtained a PhD at the University of Cambridge under the supervision of Stephen Hawking. He co-published with the latter and Lucy Hawking George and the Secrets of the Universe in 2007.

He then published the Prince of Clouds novel trilogy with Le Blueberry (2009), Le Matin des trois soleils (2012) and La Colère du ciel et du vent (2013). In 2015, he published The Universe in Your Hand.

== See also ==
- Thomas Hertog
