= Saygin Yalcin =

Dubai-based German entrepreneur (born 1984)

Saygin Yalçın
- Born: 1984 or 1985 (age 41–42)
- Citizenship: German
- Education: Monroe College
- Occupation: Businessman

Saygin Yalcin (Turkish: Saygın Yalçın; born 1984) is a Dubai-based German entrepreneur and academic lecturer of Turkish origin. He founded Sukar.com was acquired by Souq.com, which was then acquired by Amazon for $580 million.

== Personal life ==
Saygin was born in Bremen to Turkish immigrants. In his teenage years he was a skilled footballer who played in the German junior league A-Junioren Bundesliga.

== Education ==
He studied in Germany at WHU - Otto Beisheim School of Management and later in the United States and Mexico. He holds a bachelor's degree in business administration from Monroe College.

== Career ==
One of his jobs was marketing and sales at BMW in 2004. He also worked for Capgemini and L’Oreal. He began his entrepreneurial career by founding a business in Germany. Later he moved to the United Arab Emirates, where he founded Sukar.com. After selling it to Souq.com, he later established SellAnyCar.com becoming its CEO. He is also well known on social media after appearing on YouTube He is a visiting instructor on entrepreneurship at the Canadian University of Dubai. His YouTube channel produces the show Startup Hero where selected viewers pitch their idea to Yalcin and other investors for funding.

== sellanycar.com ==
For the expansion of sellanycar.com into Europe, he raised about 10 million euros in an investment round from Polar Light Ventures. In another investment round, he wanted to collect 100 million euros, which would have made the company a unicorn. However, the investment round was canceled. In 2015 sellanycar.com also came to Germany. The goal was to take over the market leadership of the unicorn AUTO1 Group. The operating business of sellanycar.com in Germany was discontinued after a few months.
