= Farah Chamma =

Palestinian writer and performer (born 1994)

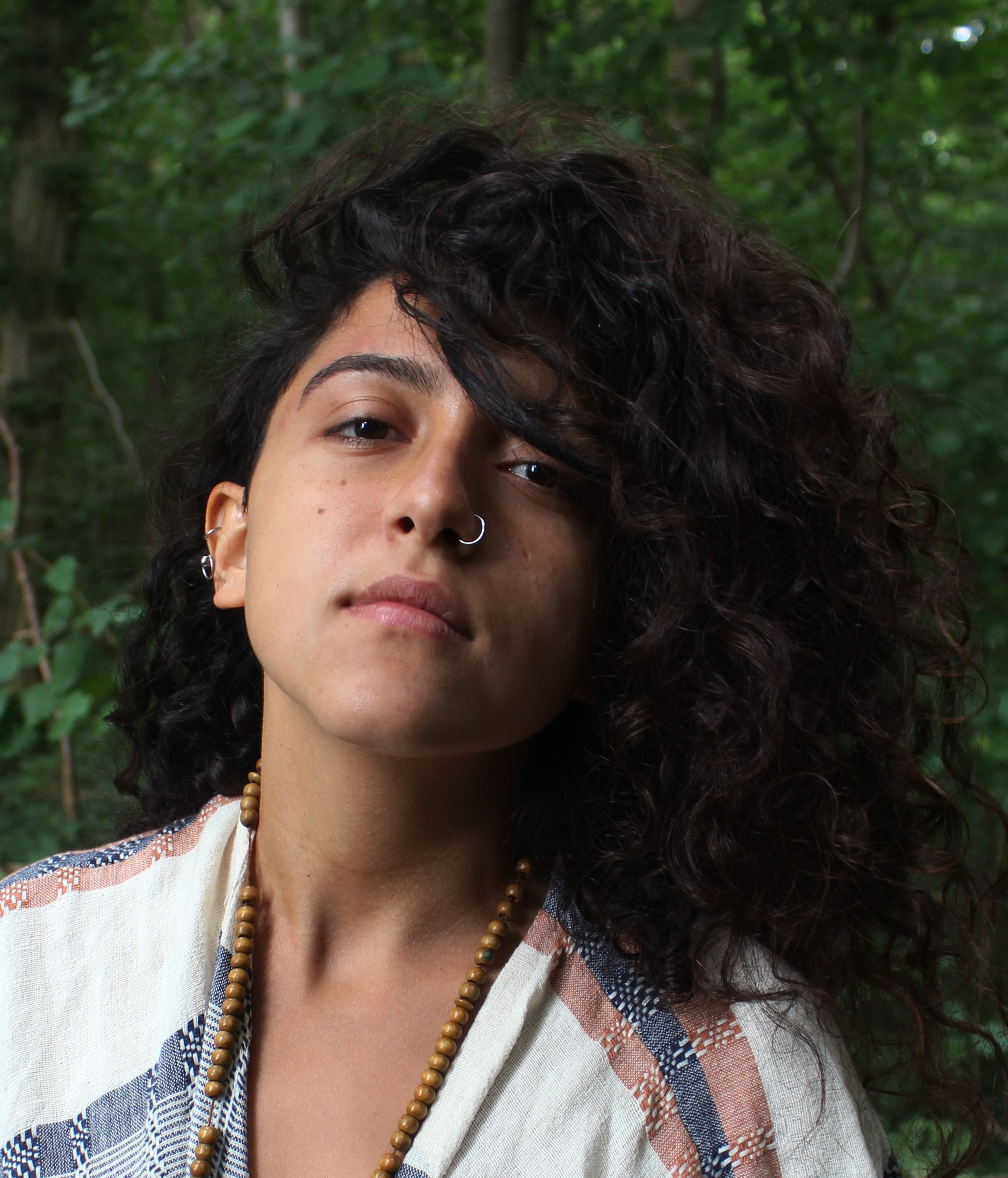
- Born: April 1994 (age 31–32); United Arab Emirates
- Education: Sorbonne University Abu Dhabi; Goldsmiths, University of London
- Occupation: Poet
- Writing career
- Language: Arabic, English, French, German, Spanish and Portuguese
- Website: www.farahchamma.com

Farah Chamma (Arabic: فرح شمّا; born 6 April, 1994) is a Palestinian spoken-word poet currently based in the United Arab Emirates. Chamma speaks six languages including Arabic, English, and French. She started sharing her poems at the age of 16 amongst The Poeticians, a group of poets from the Middle East run by the Palestinian filmmaker and writer Hind Shoufani. She is currently working with Brazilian music producer, liev, on chamæleon, a spoken-word poetry and electronic music duo. In June 2024, she was invited by Spanish singer and composer Silvia Pérez Cruz to perform as a guest poet at the launch concert of her album Toda La Vida, un Día during the inauguration of the Festival Grec de Barcelona, alongside artists such as Damien Rice, Natalia Lafourcade, and Rita Payés.

== Education and Career ==
Chamma was born in Sharjah, United Arab Emirates to a family from Safad and Nablus. At the age of eighteen, Chamma moved to Brazil and lived there for four months during which she learned the Portuguese language. She obtained her bachelor's degree in philosophy and sociology at Paris-Sorbonne University Abu Dhabi. She learned French in university as well as German and Spanish. In her final year at university, she moved to France.

Chamma began her career at age fourteen and started performing on different stages. Since 2008, she has participated in several events and festivals, including the Sikka Art Fair, organised by Dubai Culture and Arts Authority and the symposium A Sip of Poetry held in Abu Dhabi in 2012. Recently, the Emirates Airline Festival of Literature in its twelfth session organized the Identity Poetics session, in which Chamma was featured among other poets including award-winning Colombian-American poet Carlos Adres Gomez and UAE performance poetry star Afra Atiq. Chamma then pursued a master's in performance and culture at Goldsmiths, University of London which she successfully accomplished in 2019.

In 2013, Chamma released a YouTube video where she recited her Arabic poem How Must I Believe. The video received more than 250,000 views. On 4 January 2014, she published another video performance, The Nationality. In February 2019, Chamma performed in London along with oud and guitar player Maruan Betawi and percussionist Phelan Burgoyne. Chamma also has an Arabic language podcast named "Maqsouda" which is about Arabic poetry created and hosted by both Zeina Hashem Beck and Chamma.

== Video Poems ==
- Apologies (Original title: Al Maathera)
- The Nationality (Original title: Al Jensia)
- From right to left (Original title: Min Al Yamin Ela Al Shamal)
- The Sheesha (Original title: Al Sheesha)
- My Palestine (Original title: Falastini Ana)
- How Must I Believe (Original title: Kayfa O'mino)
