= Middle East Special Event & Exhibition Show =

Annual exhibition held at Dubai for Meetings, incentives, conferencing, exhibitions

Middle East Event Show & Awards (MEES)
- Status: Active
- Genre: Events, Trade shows, Awards, Exhibition, Conferences
- Venue: Madinat Jumeirah
- Location: Dubai
- Country: United Arab Emirates
- Attendance: 5000+
- Organized by: Informa Exhibitions
- Website: www.me-eventshow.com

The Middle East Special Event Show (MEES) & Awards, is an annual exhibition held in Dubai UAE for Meetings, incentives, conferencing, exhibitions (MICE), events and entertainment industry. Launched in 2011 the show provides the regional events industry with a platform to promote their products and services event managers, marketers and other relevant personnel. Previous events, Festivale and Event360, identified a need in the region for an exhibition that covered the whole of the local events industry, and so these were amalgamated to be one event in the Middle East Event Show. In 2018 the event will be re-branded to The Middle East Special Event & Exhibition Show, to be organised under the wings of The Special Event show in the USA.

In 2019 it was finally renamed to The Middle East Event Show (MEES) and takes place at the Madinat Jumeirah Resort. The exhibition is organised by Informa Connect Middle East.

Alongside the exhibition, the Middle East Special Event & Exhibition Show runs a series of educational workshops and seminars, which are free to attend. There MEES Awards night is a gala evening honouring and celebrating the best in the events industry.

== Awards evening ==
The Middle East Special Event & Exhibition Awards evening is held annually alongside the show and aims to recognise and reward excellence within the industry. In 2017 the award categories & winners were as follows:

Award	Winner
Best Trade Exhibition Under 10,000sqm Gross	Windows, Doors & Facades 2017 - dmg events Middle East, Asia & Africa
Best Trade Exhibition Over 10,000sqm Gross	The Big 5 Dubai 2016 - dmg events Middle East, Asia & Africa
Best Consumer Exhibition Under 10,000sqm Gross	Dubai Muscle Show 2016 - HBG Events
Best Consumer Exhibition Over 10,000sqm Gross	Middle East Film and Comic Con 2016 - The Alliance
Best Sporting Event	2016 Formula 1 Etihad Airways Abu Dhabi Grand Prix - Yas Marina Circuit
Best Music Event	RedFest DXB - Done Events
Best Arts, Culture & Entertainment Event	Meet d3 - Done Events
Best Meeting/Conference	Arab Media Forum - Done Events
Best Event on a Budget	Ferrari GTC4LUSSO Launch Event - The Onlooker
Best Video Content Production	Federal National Council 44th Anniversary – mamemo
Best Entertainment Production	Opening Ceremony of the Dubai Water Canal – Prodea
Best Light & Sound Production	RedFest DXB - eclipse Staging Services
Best Event Video Solution	Dubai Canal Opening Ceremony – Protec
Best Use of Technology – Product	Robotics – Protec
Best Use of Technology - Service / Software	Omega Dubai Desert Classic – InitLive
Best Venue	Warehouse @ The Fridge
Best Temp Venue or Structure	IDEX 2017 Opening Ceremony – Protec
Stand Design & Build Supplier of the Year	Emaar - Cityscape Global 2016 by Ochre
Best Supplier of the Year	Harlequin Arena
Sustainability Award	Abu Dhabi National Exhibition Company
Best Event Marketing Campaign of the Year	Yasalam 2016 - FLASH Entertainment
Outstanding Brand Activation Event	Sheraton Delight My Journey – Sweetwater
Best Employer of the Year	LINKVIVA
Young Achiever of the Year	Tom Clements - Maestra Group
Industry Icon Of The Year	Pach Ang - RedFilo Events
