= Emirates Literature Foundation =

Literature organization in the United Arab Emirates

The Emirates Literature Foundation, the home of the Emirates Airline Festival of Literature, is a literature organization in the United Arab Emirates.

It was established in 2013 by a royal decree issued by Sheikh Mohammed bin Rashid Al Maktoum, Vice President and Prime Minister of the United Arab Emirates and Ruler of Dubai. The literature foundation is formed with a total capital of Dh18.7 million.

== History ==
Established in 2013 by a decree from Sheikh Mohammed bin Rashid Al Maktoum, Ruler of Dubai, the Emirates Literature Foundation is a non-profit organisation that aims to support literature and culture in the UAE and the region and foster a love of all forms of literature. Recognising the importance of reading from a young age, the Foundation focuses on encouraging children and young people to enjoy reading for pleasure. The Emirates Literature Foundation hosts the annual Emirates Airline Festival of Literature, the largest literary and cultural event in the UAE and the Arab world; its first launch in 2009 saw the participation of around 65 authors, and its 13th edition in 2020 will host more than 205 authors from around the world.

As part of its initiatives, the Foundation implements the School Librarians Award, the annual Arabic Language Week, the International Translation Conference and the Publishing Conference, in addition to year-round school education programs, book clubs and creative writing courses. The Foundation also awards a literary figure from the United Arab Emirates the Personality of the Year Award at the annual Emirates Airline Festival of Literature.

== Foundation Activities ==
- Emirates Airline Festival of Literature
- Chapter One: Emirates Literature Fellowship and My Friend for Writers
- Dubai Translation Conference

== Foundation Initiatives ==
- Voices of Future Generations
- School Librarians Award
- Reading for Pleasure Project
- Kateb Maktub
- ELF Publishing

=== Publishing Department ===
It includes several projects, including:

- From the Inside Out Project
- Tolerance Book Collection
- In Love with Words
- Book Clubs
