= Black Holes and Baby Universes and Other Essays =

Book by Stephen Hawking

- Hardcover edition
- Author: Stephen Hawking
- Language: English
- Publisher: Bantam Dell Publishing Group
- Publication date: 1993
- Publication place: United States
- Media type: Print
- Pages: 182
- ISBN: 978-0553095234
- OCLC: 28113477
- LC Class: QC16.H33 A3 1993
- Preceded by: A Brief History of Time
- Followed by: The Universe in a Nutshell

Black Holes and Baby Universes and other Essays is a 1993 popular science book by English physicist Stephen Hawking.

== Overview ==
This book is a collection of essays and lectures written by Hawking, mainly about the makeup of black holes, and why they might be nodes from which other universes grow. Hawking discusses black hole thermodynamics, special relativity, general relativity, and quantum mechanics. Hawking also describes his life when he was young, and his later experience of motor neurone disease. The book also includes an interview with Professor Hawking.
