= List of things named after Stephen Hawking =

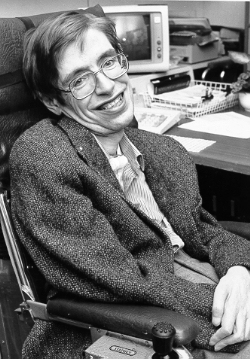
Stephen Hawking (1942–2018)

This is a list of things named after the British physicist Stephen Hawking (1942–2018).

== Physics and mathematics ==
- Bekenstein-Hawking formula for Bekenstein–Hawking entropy, a way to calculate the entropy of a black hole, named after Jacob Bekenstein and Hawking, whose ideas on black hole entropy were combined into the equation.
- Gibbons–Hawking ansatz, named Gary Gibbons and Hawking, a method of constructing gravitational instantons.
- Gibbons–Hawking–York boundary term, named after Gary Gibbons, James W. York and Hawking. It is a correction to the Einstein–Hilbert action in the presence of a boundary.
- Gibbons–Hawking effect, named after Gary Gibbons and Hawking, is the statement that a temperature can be associated to each solution of the Einstein field equations under certain conditions.
- Gibbons–Hawking space, named after Gary Gibbons and Hawking, a concept in algebraic geometry.
- Hartle–Hawking state and Hartle–Hawking function, a proposal concerning the state of the universe prior to the Planck epoch. It is named after James Hartle and Hawking.
- Hawking energy or Hawking mass, an approximation of the mass-energy of a region of spacetime, under general relativity, the method of calculation put forward by Hawking.
- Hawking paradox, the paradox left by Hawking radiation, whereby a black hole may evaporate away emitting random radiation, but the information which is consumed by the black hole during its lifetime is not returned to the universe, destroying information, violating the law for the conservation of information. Named after Hawking radiation, discovered by Hawking.
- Hawking–Page phase transition, a theoretical predicted phase transition in AdS black holes, named after Hawking and Don Page.
- Hawking point, a theoretical prediction of conformal cyclic cosmology.
- Hawking radiation, a theoretical type of radiation emitted by black holes evaporating, first conceived by Hawking, and subsequently named for him.
- Hawking star, a theoretical type of star with a black hole core, named in honour of Hawking, for his conceptualization of the primordial black hole type, which forms the core of this star type.
- Penrose–Hawking singularity theorems for predicting when singularities occur, named after Roger Penrose and Stephen Hawking.

== Entertainment ==
- Brave New World with Stephen Hawking, 2011 science documentary mini-series produced by Channel 4 presented by Professor Stephen Hawking.
- Genius by Stephen Hawking, 2016 TV documentary aired on PBS hosted by Stephen Hawking.
- Hawking (2004 film), biographical drama television film directed by Philip Martin and written by Peter Moffat. Starring Benedict Cumberbatch, it chronicles Hawking's early years as a PhD student at the University of Cambridge.
- Hawking (2013 film), biographical documentary film about Stephen Hawking directed by Stephen Finnigan and featuring Hawking himself.
- Into the Universe with Stephen Hawking, 2010 science documentary mini-series written by Hawking. The series was created for Discovery Channel by Darlow Smithson.
- Stephen Hawking's Favorite Places, 2016 documentary series that was released exclusively on Curiosity Stream, in partnership with production company Bigger Bang. Stephen Hawking stars in and narrates the series.
- Stephen Hawking: Master of the Universe, 2008 TV documentary television series produced by Channel 4. The subject of the series is Stephen Hawking, who is also the presenter of the series.
- Stephen Hawking's Universe, 1997 documentary by PBS, featuring Hawking.
- The Hawking Excitation, episode of the TV show The Big Bang Theory, with a cameo of Hawking.

== Organizations and Facilities ==
- Hawking Centre For Theoretical Cosmology, established by Hawking in the Department of Applied Mathematics and Theoretical Physics at Cambridge University.
- Stephen Hawking Foundation, a nonprofit organization supporting science and health research.
- Stephen Hawking Centre, a research centre and facility of the Perimeter Institute for Theoretical Physics, Waterloo, Ontario, Canada.
- Stephen W. Hawking Center for Microgravity Research and Education, A research and educational institute focused on space exploration and reduced gravity at the University of Central Florida, USA.
- Stephen Hawking School, a primary school in Tower Hamlets, London, serving children with severe learning difficulties.
- Museo de Ciencias Stephen Hawking, a science museum in San Salvador, El Salvador.
- Stephen Hawking Building at Gonville & Caius College, Cambridge.
- Stephen W. Hawking Auditorium at Texas A & M University in College Station, Texas, USA.

== Other ==
- Hawking Index, a measure of how far into a book, the typical reader will undertake, before giving up. Coined by mathematician Jordan Ellenberg in honor of Stephen Hawking, whose best selling book A Brief History of Time was notoriously frequently bought but never completely read to the finish.
- Hawking Fellowship academic annual fellowship of the University of Cambridge.
- Stephen Hawking Medal for Science Communication, an award given at the Starmus Festival, named after Hawking.
- Thorne-Hawking and Thorne–Hawking–Preskill bets, wagers between Kip Thorne, John Preskill and Hawking over the solution to the black hole information paradox.
- 7672 Hawking, a minor planet

== See also ==
- Publications of Stephen Hawking (bibliography)
- Stephen Hawking in popular culture
