= AdS black brane =

Solution to Einstein equation

An anti de Sitter black brane is a solution of the Einstein equations in the presence of a negative cosmological constant which possesses a planar event horizon. This is distinct from an anti de Sitter black hole solution which has a spherical event horizon. The negative cosmological constant implies that the spacetime will asymptote to an anti de Sitter spacetime at spatial infinity.

== Math development ==
The Einstein equation is given by

$R_{\mu\nu}-\frac{1}{2}R g_{\mu\nu}+\Lambda g_{\mu\nu}=0,$

where $R_{\mu\nu}$ is the Ricci curvature tensor, R is the Ricci scalar, $\Lambda$ is the cosmological constant and $g_{\mu\nu}$ is the metric we are solving for.

We will work in d spacetime dimensions with coordinates $(t,r,x_1,...,x_{d-2})$ where $r\geq0$ and $-\infin<t,x_1,...,x_{d-2}<\infin$. The line element for a spacetime that is stationary, time reversal invariant, space inversion invariant, rotationally invariant

and translationally invariant in the $x_i$ directions is given by,

$ds^2=L^2\left(\frac{dr^2}{r^2h(r)}+r^2(-dt^2f(r)+d\vec{x}^2)\right)$.

Replacing the cosmological constant with a length scale L

$\Lambda=-\frac{1}{2L^2}(d-1)(d-2)$,

we find that,

$f(r)=a\left(1-\frac{b}{r^{d-1}}\right)$

$h(r)=1-\frac{b}{r^{d-1}}$

with $a$ and $b$ integration constants, is a solution to the Einstein equation.

The integration constant $a$ is associated with a residual symmetry associated with a rescaling of the time coordinate. If we require that the line element takes the form,

$ds^2=L^2\left(\frac{dr^2}{r^2}+r^2(-dt^2+d\vec{x})\right)$, when r goes to infinity, then we must set $a=1$.

The point $r=0$ represents a curvature singularity and the point $r^{d-1}=b$ is a coordinate singularity when $b>0$. To see this, we switch to the coordinate system $(v,r,x_1,...,x_{d-2})$ where $v=t+r^*(r)$ and $r^*(r)$ is defined by the differential equation,

$\frac{dr^*}{dr}=\frac{1}{r^2h(r)}$.

The line element in this coordinate system is given by,

$ds^2=L^2(-r^2h(r)dv^2+2dvdr+r^2d\vec{x}^2)$,

which is regular at $r^{d-1}=b$. The surface $r^{d-1}=b$ is an event horizon.
