= Stephen Hawking in popular culture =

Cultural depictions of Stephen Hawking

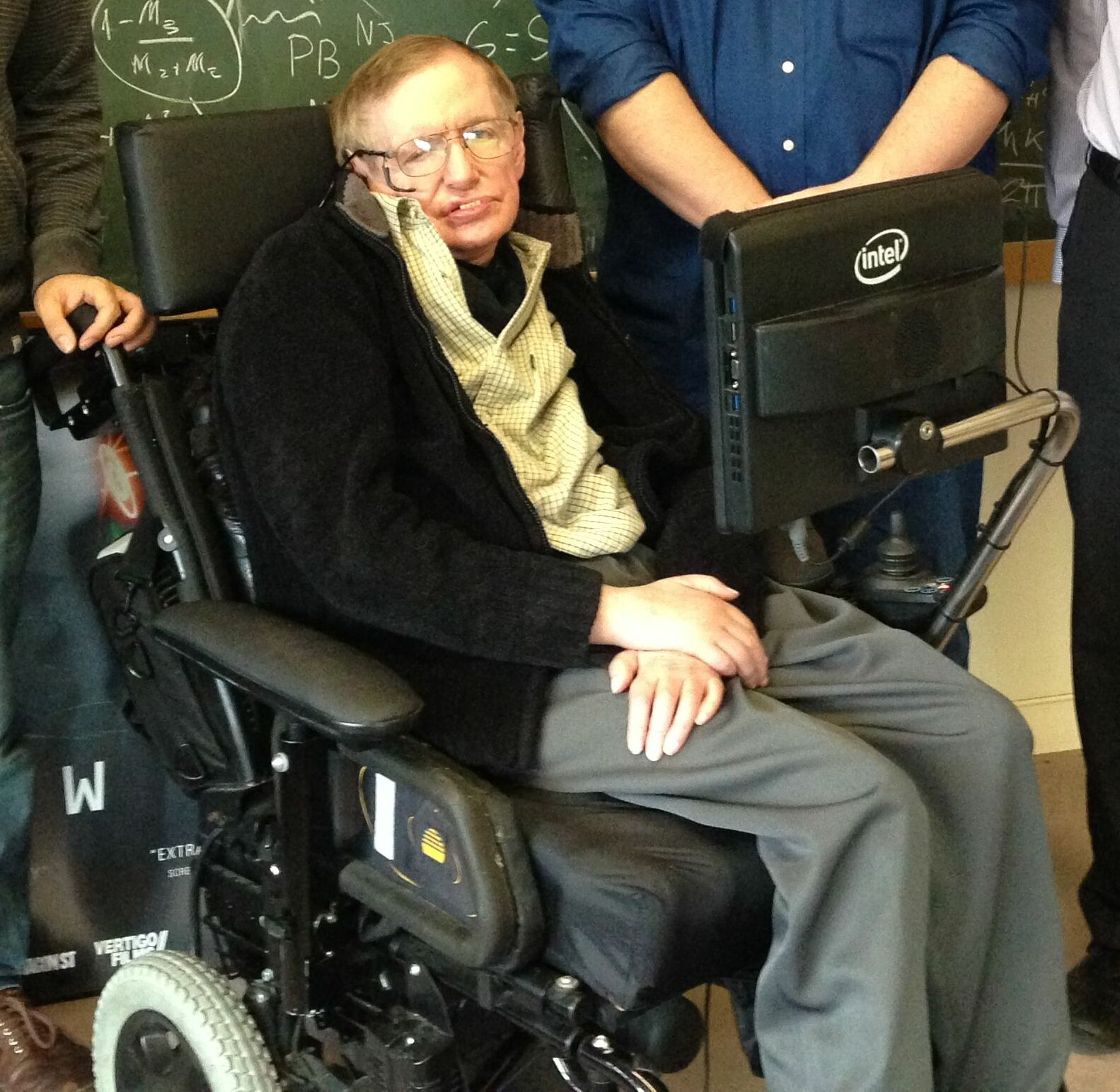
Stephen Hawking in 2014

Stephen Hawking (1942–2018), a theoretical physicist, appeared in many works of popular culture.

== Television and film ==
=== Appeared as himself ===
==== Comedy and drama ====
- The Culture Show. (Simpsons special)
- Alien Planet. (Discovery Channel special)
- I Love the World. (Discovery Channel commercial)
- Late Night with Conan O'Brien (episode 1752). He was in a skit in which he made a phone call to guest Jim Carrey.
- TV Offal. Hawking appeared with host Victor Lewis-Smith in the pre-titles sequences of this show.
- Star Trek: The Next Generation
  - At the release party for the home video version of the A Brief History of Time, Leonard Nimoy, who had played Spock on Star Trek: The Original Series, learned that Hawking was interested in appearing on the show. Nimoy made the necessary contact, and as a result Hawking appears at the beginning of the Season 6 cliffhanger, "Descent", when Data is seen playing poker with holographic depictions of Hawking, Sir Isaac Newton, and Albert Einstein. Hawking portrayed his own hologram for this episode, making him the only guest in any Star Trek series to play himself. When taking a tour of the set, he paused at the Warp core, smiled, and said, "I'm working on that." During the tour, Hawking requested, and was allowed, to sit in the captain's chair of the Enterprise-D.
- The Big Bang Theory. (episode 108: "The Hawking Excitation"; episode 117: "The Extract Obliteration" (voice-over); episode 155: "The Relationship Diremption" (voice-over); episode 173: "The Troll Manifestation"; episode 200: "The Celebration Experimentation"; episode 216: "The Geology Elevation"; episode 232: "The Proposal Proposal".)
- Red Nose Day 2015. Hawking appears with David Walliams and Catherine Tate as an Andy Pipkin character, who transforms into a machine.

==== Voiced himself in animation ====
Hawking as a cartoon character in The Simpsons (Note: Episode: "They Saved Lisa's Brain")

- Futurama:
  - In "Anthology of Interest I" (2000) Hawking appears as a member of the Vice Presidential Action Rangers (VPAR), who guard the space-time continuum. Along with Hawking at the end of the twentieth century they include Al Gore, Nichelle Nichols, Gary Gygax, and their summer intern Deep Blue. He first appears as a customer at the pizzeria where Fry believes him to have "invented gravity", and Hawking neglects to correct him. After learning of Fry's inter-dimensional experience, he arranges for him to be kidnapped by the VPAR.
  - In the film The Beast with a Billion Backs (2008), Hawking appears as his own head in a jar leading a scientific convention organized to study and discuss a tear in the universe. He says that despite writing a book about it, he has no idea what it is. After stunning Professor Farnsworth and Professor Wernstrom with beams from his eyes, he is surprised, remarking, "I didn't know I could do that". Hawking provided his "own" voice for this appearance, and is characterised the same way as in The Simpsons.
  - Hawking appeared in the video game segment of season 6's finale, "Reincarnation" (2011).
  - Hawking made his final appearance in a 2017 promo trailer for Futurama: Worlds of Tomorrow.
- The Simpsons:
  - In "They Saved Lisa's Brain" (1999), Lisa joins the power-hungry Springfield chapter of Mensa, who take over the local council with the intention of transforming Springfield into a Platonic Utopia. Hawking gets wind of the group's actions and arrives in Springfield to investigate. When Mensa announce their new draconian laws, the crowd gathered quickly transforms into an angry mob. Hawking saves Lisa with his wheelchair, which is equipped with hidden gadgets including retractable helicopter blades and a spring-loaded boxing glove. He later joins Homer for a beer at Moe's, where Homer impresses him with his theory of a donut-shaped universe.
  - He makes a brief cameo in "Life's a Glitch, Then You Die" (1999). He appears queuing for the rocket trip to Mars.
  - During the British Comedy Awards 2004, Hawking was presented with a one-off toy version of himself in Simpson form by Matt Groening, complete with boxing glove. Hawking presented Groening with a lifetime achievement award.
  - In the episode "Don't Fear the Roofer" (2005) he is again at Moe's, for Lenny's birthday party. He later explains that he was tracking a miniature black hole, which drew light away from Homer's "imaginary friend" Ray (guest voice Ray Romano), thus making him invisible to Bart. Homer is therefore able to prove his sanity after being institutionalized.
  - In the episode "Stop or My Dog Will Shoot" (2007), Santa's Little Helper encounters Hawking in a corn maze while searching for a lost Homer. Hawking says "This maze is too hard for me," and then flies off in the helicopter attachment.
  - In the episode "Elementary School Musical" (2010), Hawking raps with Flight of the Conchords for Lisa.

==== Factual ====
- Last Week Tonight with John Oliver. Interview, 15 June 2014
- Red Dwarf. Hawking appeared in a special programme about the popular British science fiction series. He praised its creators for their witty use of (pseudo) scientific theories and said he enjoyed watching the show.
- The 11th Hour. In this film about the effects of human activity on the environment Hawking gave explanations of these effects.
- Genius of Britain. Hawking presented the links for a five-part 2010 Channel 4 series profiling British scientists.
- University Challenge 2016–17. Hawking presented the winner's trophy to the team from Balliol College, Oxford.
- God, the Universe and Everything Else. Interview with Arthur C. Clarke and Carl Sagan.

==== Narration ====
- Into the Universe with Stephen Hawking. A three-part miniseries about aliens, time travel and the past and present of mankind
- Masters of Science Fiction. A science fiction anthology series.

=== Played by an actor ===
- Hawking. Portrayed by actor Benedict Cumberbatch in a drama about Hawking's time as a postgraduate student at Cambridge University.
- Stargate Atlantis. In the 5th season of Stargate Atlantis, episode 16 "Brain Storm", where many world physicists were invited to a demonstration of cooling effect using a wormhole between 2 universes. Stephen Hawking, played by an actor, was shown in his chair from behind.
- Superhero Movie. In a parodied take on Spider-Man, Hawking, played by the actor Robert Joy, jokes about himself within.
- The Theory of Everything. Portrayed by actor Eddie Redmayne in a biopic about Hawking from the early 1960s to the 1980s. Hawking agreed to allow the filmmakers use of his speech synthesizer voice for the film.
- Sausage Party. Portrayed by storyboard artist Scott Underwood in the animated movie, parodied as a piece of gum.

=== Referenced ===
- Glee. In the episode "What The World Needs Now"; Hawking is referenced as being the biological father of Brittany Pierce.
- Computer Stew. Hawking's image was animated and used as a character in several episodes.
- The Wrong Coast. A segment of the show tells about a movie called Party Time Continuum, in which Hawking is portrayed as a time-travelling party-animal played by Seth Green.
- Weebl and Bob. In their clip "Balance", Hawking flies across the screen in his buggy and the various characters play around with his speech synthesiser against his will, making it say strange things, such as "I've wet my pants".
- User Friendly. Hawking realizes in a power blackout that all the dark matter in the universe may be grues.
- Superhero Movie. Hawking, played by actor Robert Joy, first appears as a judge in a science fair who offers weed to the students and later helps Dragonfly (Drake Bell).
- Knocked Up. Jonah, while playing in a wheelchair, does an imitation of Hawking by saying (in a robot voice) "People think I'm smart because I speak in a robot voice."
- The Vicar of Dibley. In the episode "Winter" from the Seasonal Specials, when casting for the Christmas Nativity play, Frank Pickle decided to base his version of the Wise Man on Stephen Hawking, speaking in a voice that sounded only slightly similar to Hawking's synthesized voice.
- Father Ted. In the episode "Are You Right There Father Ted" from the Third Season, Father Dougal mentions an occasion when Father Ted had done an impression of Stephen Hawking in a variety show only for Stephen Hawking to turn up unexpectedly.
- The Big Bang Theory. In the pilot episode, Howard Wolowitz brings over a tape, stating that it is a Stephen Hawking lecture recorded in 1974, "before he became a creepy computer voice." In an episode in Season 2, Leonard impersonates a fellow physicist's impersonation of Hawking on the phone. In an episode in Season Four, it was mentioned that Sheldon had been tricked by his friends into going to the airport at 2 am to meet him. In Season 6 episode 6, Sheldon Cooper and Stephen Hawking also engage in a game of 'Words with friends' over internet. The two come up with pet names of Coop and Rolling Thunder. In the end, to Sheldon's dismay, Hawking insults him.
- Young Sheldon. A copy of Hawking's book, 'A Brief History of Time', can be seen lying on Sheldon's shelf and it's shown and mentioned multiple times throughout the series.
- The Colbert Report. Stephen Colbert, in character as a right-wing conservative pundit ala Bill O'Reilly, has frequently featured segments entitled "Stephen Hawking is Such an A-Hole", citing reasons such as the 'megalomaniacal' title of his program, "Stephen Hawking: Master of the Universe". "There is only one master of the universe," Colbert responded, "and that's He-Man."
- Men in Black: International. A copy of Hawking's book A Brief History of Time is seen lying on top of a bed in an early part of the film.
- The Avengers. Phil Coulson speaks to Captain America aboard the quinjet and describes Bruce Banner as being like Hawking, a "smart guy", in his human form.
- Transformers: Animated. The Autobot Perceptor is voiced by PlainTalk as an homage to his fellow super-genius, Stephen Hawking.

==== Animation ====
- The Critic. In the episode "Uneasy Rider" in which he becomes a truck driver, Jay and his new trucker friends go to see "Ultimate Force" at a drive-in, which one of the truckers states will most definitely feature "a tough guy on wheels." The movie turns out to feature Hawking discussing his theories on relative force.
- Dilbert. Hawking was portrayed in an episode about Dilbert's project, the Gruntmaster 6000, whose "graviton generator" could create a black hole to wipe out all life on Earth. In "field testing" done without consulting Dilbert, the Gruntmaster 6000 was sent to a family in Squiddler's Patch, Texas, where a family of four, living in a trailer, and rather stupid, somehow destroyed the graviton generator, and created a black hole. During the episode, it is "revealed" that Hawking has the power to travel through both time and space via wormholes, and Dilbert learns the hard way that you should never bet money that a theoretical physicist can't do something. Hawking in this also calls Dilbert a "cheap bastard" for only borrowing his book in a library.
- The Fairly OddParents. Hawking appears in the episode "Remy Rides Again", voiced by Dee Bradley Baker. When Crocker mocks Timmy for thinking that 2+2=5, Remy hires Hawking to prove that this result can actually be obtained, and Timmy was therefore right. At the end of the episode, Hawking rockets away in his wheelchair and disappears like the DeLorean. Crocker runs after him, protesting that 2+2 actually equals 6.
- Family Guy:
  - Hawking's persona was first featured in the episode "Peter, Peter, Caviar Eater"; it is a brief cameo during the song "This House Is Freaking Sweet"; Hawking is presented as the man who will help Chris do his homework. During this time he is tapping his foot.
  - He makes a cameo appearance on "It Takes a Village Idiot, and I Married One". He is seen with his wife sitting by a fire singing "She'll be coming around the mountain".
  - In "April in Quahog" Hawking has been interviewed by Tricia Takanawa about a black hole dooming the Earth, and afterwards reveals he has faked his illness.
  - It is revealed he worked at The Source of All Dirty Jokes in the episode "The Splendid Source".
- Ugly Americans. A show on Comedy Central, Leonard and the blob visit Stephen and steal his voice-box for their own use.
- Mr. Peabody and Sherman. Sherman has a lunchbox with Hawking on it, with the words 'A Brief History of Lunch'.

== Music and radio ==
- Brian May (lead guitarist of Queen and astrophysicist) used recordings of Stephen Hawking's voice in his song "New Horizons (Ultima Thule Mix)" (written to celebrate New Horizon NASA space probe journey).
- The Hitchhiker's Guide to the Galaxy. The voice of the book in the new series, The Hexagonal Phase first broadcast on BBC Radio 4 on Thursday 8 March: BBC Home page for The Hitchhiker's Guide to the Galaxy
- Jon Holmes. The comedian's BBC Radio 6 Music radio show features Hawking reciting songs lyrics as suggested by listeners. These have included 'Gay Bar' by Electric Six and 'Prime Mover' by Zodiac Mindwarp.
- Greydon Square. The atheist rapper makes several references to Hawking, most poignantly in "The Dream" expressing his dream "to be walking with Stephen Hawking along the beach talking theory".
- The Bob & Tom Show. Hawking is portrayed (and his computerised voice simulated) in a spoof of the show I'm with Busey. At the end of the spoof, he's heard cursing his roommate for being so stupid.
- Juno Reactor. Hawking is quoted in the track "Landing" from electronica/ambient band Juno Reactor's album Transmissions.
- Manic Street Preachers. The band's album Journal for Plague Lovers (2009) features a track entitled "Me and Stephen Hawking".
- MC Hawking. Using a speech synthesizer similar to Hawking's, nerdcore artist Ken Lawrence performs as the imaginary alter-ego for the "theoretical physicist turned gangster-rapper." Song titles include "E=MC Hawking" ("I explode like a bomb/no one is spared/my power is my mass times the speed of light squared"), "Fuck the Creationists" ("Fuck the damn creationists I say it with authority/because kicking their punk asses be my paramount priority") and "Entropy" ("You down with entropy?") The success of the MC Hawking amongst internet users eventually led to a 'greatest hits' compilation CD entitled A Brief History of Rhyme (a play on Hawking's A Brief History of Time book title), featuring album artwork done by comic artist Tony Moore. Hawking himself is reported to have said that he is "flattered, as it's a modern day equivalent to Spitting Image". Lawrence has performed as MC Hawking for Hawking himself.
- Pink Floyd. Hawking's "voice" was sampled by Pink Floyd (from a UK British Telecom television advert) and used in their song, "Keep Talking" from the album The Division Bell (1994). Hawking's voice also appeared on the instrumental track "Talkin' Hawkin'" from their album The Endless River (2014).
- Richard Cheese & Lounge Against the Machine. Richard and Hawking sing "The Girl Is Mine" as a charming duet on the album Aperitif for Destruction (2005). (Celebrity voices impersonated.)
- Robin Williams, on his DVD Robin Williams: Live on Broadway (2002), mentioned that "I called Stephen Hawking's house once", and proceeded in a mechanical voice: "Hello this is Stephen Hawking." "Yes, I'd like to leave a message." "No. This is Stephen Hawking.". On the B-side track 'Boston' of the CD release of the 2002 comedy tour, Williams mentions that "MIT is the only place Stephen Hawking can do comedy" followed by a René Descartes joke.
- Todd Rundgren. The song "Hawking" from the 1989 album "Nearly Human" is about Stephen Hawking.
- Turbonegro. Hawking's voice is featured on the song "Intro: The Party Zone" on Turbonegro's album Party Animals (2005), saying "Greetings. My name is Stephen Hawking. Anyways... Please follow our denim leaders as they enter the final black hole; a new dimension in rock music. Welcome to the Party Zone."
- Yes. The song Real Love from their 1994 album Talk includes the line, "Far away, in the depths of Hawking's mind."
- Symphony of Science. In the original production by John Boswell, portions of Hawking's Universe series were used as lyrics and included in 'A Glorious Dawn'.
- Radiohead. Stephen Hawking is often mistakenly thought to have given his voice to "Fitter Happier" on Radiohead's album OK Computer. It is actually a Text-to-Speech from Thom Yorke's Apple Macintosh computer via the program SimpleText.
- Epic Rap Battles of History. Stephen Hawking, portrayed by series co-founder Nice Peter, appeared in the seventh episode against Albert Einstein (portrayed by Zach Sherwin). Peter's portrayal later reappeared in the series' first-season finale and second and third season premieres.
- The FuMP. In Volume 1, the song "Talk Nerdy to Me" (a spoof of "Talk Dirty to Me") includes a Stephen Hawking-like voice near the song's ending, which is an acknowledgement of Hawking's references with "nerd" culture.
- Nolwenn Leroy. The French singer-songwriter released the song "Stephen", inspired by Hawking's theories, on her album Gemme (2017).
- Blaze Bayley. On his LP, War Within Me (2021), track 9 (The Unstoppable Stephen Hawking) is based on the life of Stephen Hawking.
- Leningrad Nights. The song «Black Holes (As Cool As Hawking Was)» from the fourth album Physics (2025) is dedicated to Stephen Hawking.

== Books, comics and newspapers ==
- Ancient Shores. In this science fiction novel, he is one of several luminaries who are heroes of climax of the novel.
- The Adventures of Dr. McNinja. A character known as Dr. Birding is featured as a parody of Hawking and The Incredible Hulk, having the Hulk's monstrous transformations, but still remaining paralyzed in monster form.
- Casey and Andy. In this webcomic by Andy Weir, the titular characters fly to England to kidnap Stephen Hawking to assist them in shutting down a miniature black hole they have opened in their house, only for him to somehow severely injure the duo for attempting to do so (kidnap him) while he was watching EastEnders. (Note: Galactanet - The Creative Writings of Andy Weir, Casey and Andy Strip #279)
- The Coming of the Quantum Cats. Several Hawkings from different alternate universes ("in varying states of health") make a cameo appearance in this science fiction novel by Frederik Pohl. They are all involved with their particular Earth's plans to develop technology that would allow travel between alternate universes.
- Hyperion Cantos. Hawking's name appears across the tetralogy under the terms such as the Hawking drive and the name of the Hegemony frigate HSS Stephen Hawking.
- Extremely Loud and Incredibly Close. The main character, nine-year-old Oskar Schell, writes letters to Stephen Hawking frequently and once even receives a letter by Hawking that is addressed directly to him.
- The Onion. Satirical newspaper ran an article claiming that Hawking had constructed himself a super-powered robotic exoskeleton, complete with a jetpack and claws that can rip through tanks. Hawking, with his typical good humour, sent them a letter cursing them for exposing his evil plans for world domination. Hawking also had a printout of the article pinned up in his Cambridge office for some time after it was published.
- Ultimate X-Men. In Ultimate X-Men #25, there is a reference to Stephen Hawking having written an article on mutants, apparently stating that they were mankind's last hope against the rise of artificial intelligence. This makes him one of the rare humans who sympathize with mutants. In addition, the Earth-616 continuity has stated or hinted more than once that Hawking and Hank McCoy (Beast) are close friends.
- Bloom County. In the comic strip, Hawking was said to have had a rivalry with the strip's resident boy scientist, Oliver Wendell Jones.
- JLA. Batman manages to defeat the supervillain Prometheus by replacing the martial arts skills Prometheus had downloaded into his mind with the physical skills and coordination of Hawking. Batman later commented that this was the "first time [he] ever hit a man with motor neuron disease".
- Atomic Robo. Hawking creates a fake psychological profile of ATOMIC ROBO indicating the robot hero has a power-standby mode, thus making him an ideal candidate for an envoy for the Viking Mars lander. As ATOMIC ROBO does not have a power-standby mode, this leads ROBO to spend the entire Ten month trip without sufficient means to stave off boredom/maintain sanity.
- Hyperion. In this novel by Dan Simmons space travel ships are driven by "Hawking drive". This drive was invented by 'race' of Artificial Intelligences (AIs), and allows to make faster-than-light flights.
- Origin. Hawking makes an appearance in Chapter 98 of this 2017 Dan Brown book stating "It is not necessary to invoke God to set the universe going. Spontaneous creation is the reason there is something rather than nothing."
- Dawn on Me (Chinese: 朝闻道) by Liu Cixin. Einstein Equator, the largest particle accelerator built by human, was destroyed by an alien before we would soon conduct a physics experiment that might destroy the universe. The alien agreed to tell the scientists about the Grand Unified Theory or any other theories, while the scientists who learned of the theory would die in 10 minutes to avoid a leak. Stephen Hawking, as the last scientist to seek an answer, asked the alien after all the other scientists had died: "What is the purpose of the universe?" The alien fell silent, and he sadly realized he couldn't answer the question either.

== Other media ==
- The DVD release of Harry Potter and the Prisoner of Azkaban has a picture of one of the wizards in the Leaky Cauldron reading A Brief History of Time while using magic to stir his coffee.
- British Telecom (BT). Hawking appeared in and did the voice-over for a BT television advert which aired in 1993. Parts of his voice from this were sampled by Pink Floyd and used on their album, The Division Bell which was released in 1994.
- Shin Megami Tensei. In this video game and its sequel, there is a wheelchair-using character who is obviously based on Stephen Hawking, named Steven. In Shin Megami Tensei IV, the character is referred to as Stephen, further cementing the homage.
- Chapman Brothers. The British artists produced a sculpture entitled Übermensch depicting Hawking in his wheelchair on top of a rocky outcrop.
- Go Compare. Hawking announces at a press conference he has formulated the properties needed to generate a black hole; a press reporter asks what Hawking plans to do with it, which leads to a cutaway of the black hole being used to suck in Gio Compario.
- Phil Hansen. In Phil Hansen's breakout art piece Influential, Stephen Hawking was referenced in 5 of the layers of influence, with one clearly being of Hawking himself. "He affected my outlook on life. He made me think about what life is and what I should do with it."
- Microshaft Winblows 98. In this parody program, Stephen Hawking (impersonated by an actor) calls Microsoft tech support to complain about the quality of their products.
- Jimmy Carr – Stand up DVD. Jimmy Carr claims to have written a letter to him from his (fictional) 9-year-old son. According to Carr, Hawking paid for a free balloon ride for Jimmy's fictional disabled son.
- Symphony of Science. Clips of Hawking are used in the first and fifth installments, "A Glorious Dawn" and "The Poetry of Reality".
- Touhou Project. ZUN references Hawking in the comments for one of the spell cards of the character Eirin Yagokoro in Imperishable Night, calling him the "wheelchair man". He has also released a song entitled "Future Universe of Wheelchair" on his album Magical Astronomy.
- Lollipop Chainsaw In the video game, Juliet Starling berates Josey for 'making fun of Stephen Hawking' after he speaks through a voice box.
- Monty Python Live (Mostly). In the Monty Python's Live Shows in 2014, Hawking sang an extended version of the Galaxy Song, after running down Brian Cox in his wheelchair, in a pre-recorded video.
- The Simpsons: Tapped Out. Hawking appeared as a guest character in the scifi 2016 event.
- Jaguar Cars. Stephen Hawking has appeared on television commercials advertising Jaguar cars.

== See also ==
- List of things named after Stephen Hawking
