= History of time =

History of time may refer to

- Standard time#History of standard time, for information of the history of standardizing time
- A Brief History of Time, book by Stephen Hawking
- Chronology of the universe, subject matter of Hawking's book
