= Regge–Wheeler–Zerilli equations =

Pair of equations describing black holes

Red lines: Regge-Wheeler potentials. Blue lines: Zerilli potentials

In general relativity, Regge–Wheeler–Zerilli equations are a pair of equations that describe gravitational perturbations of a Schwarzschild black hole, named after Tullio Regge, John Archibald Wheeler and Frank J. Zerilli. The perturbations of a Schwarzchild metric are classified into two types, namely, axial and polar perturbations, a terminology introduced by Subrahmanyan Chandrasekhar. Axial perturbations induce frame dragging by imparting rotation to the black hole and change sign when the azimuthal direction is reversed, whereas polar perturbations do not impart rotation and do not change sign under the reversal of azimuthal direction. The equation for axial perturbations is called Regge–Wheeler equation and the equation governing polar perturbations is called Zerilli equation.

When assuming an harmonic time-dependence, the equations take the same form of the one-dimensional Schrödinger equation. The equations read as

$$\left(\frac{d^2}{dr_*^2} + \sigma^2\right) Z^{\pm} = V^{\pm} Z^{\pm}$$

where $Z^+$ characterises the polar perturbations and $Z^-$ the axial perturbations. Here $r_*=r+2M\ln(r/2M-1)$ is the tortoise coordinate (we set $G=c=1$), $r$ belongs to the Schwarzschild coordinates $(t,r,\theta,\varphi)$, $2M$ is the Schwarzschild radius and $\sigma$ represents the time frequency of the perturbations appearing in the form $e^{i\sigma t}$. The Regge–Wheeler potential and Zerilli potential are respectively given by

$$V^{-}= \frac{2(r^2-2Mr)}{r^5}[(n+1)r-3M]$$
$$V^{+}= \frac{2(r^2-2Mr)}{r^5(nr+3M)^2}[n^2(n+1)r^3+3Mn^2r^2+9M^2nr + 9M^3]$$

where $2n=(l-1)(l+2)$ and $l=2,3,4,\dots$ characterizes the eigenmode for the $\theta$ coordinate. For gravitational perturbations, the modes $l=0,\,1$ are irrelevant because they do not evolve with time. Physically gravitational perturbations with $l=0$ (monopole) mode represents a change in the black hole mass, whereas the $l=1$ (dipole) mode corresponds to a shift in the location and value of the black hole's angular momentum. The shape of above potentials are exhibited in the figure.

In tortoise coordinates, $r_* \rightarrow -\infty$ denotes the event horizon and $r_* \rightarrow \infty$ is equivalent to $r\rightarrow \infty$ i.e., to distances far away from the back hole. The potentials are short-ranged as they decay faster than $1/r_*$; as $r_*\rightarrow \infty$ we have $V^{\pm}\rightarrow 2(n+1)/r^2$ and as $r_*\rightarrow -\infty$, we have $V^{\pm}\sim e^{r_*/2M}.$ Consequently, the asymptotic behaviour of the solutions for $r_*\rightarrow \pm\infty$ is $e^{\pm i\sigma r_*}.$

== Relations between the two problems ==
In 1975, Subrahmanyan Chandrasekhar and Steven Detweiler discovered a one-to-one mapping between the two equations, leading to a consequence that the spectrum corresponding to both potentials are identical. The two potentials can also be written as

$$V^{\pm} = \pm 6M \frac{df}{dr_*} +  (6Mf)^2 + 4n(n+1) f, \quad f = \frac{r^2-2Mr}{2r^3(nr+3M)}.$$

The relations between $Z^+$ and $Z^-$ are given by

$$[4n(n+1)\pm 12 i \sigma M] Z^{\pm} = \left[4n(n+1) + \frac{72M^2(r^2-2Mr)}{r^3(2nr+6M)}\right] Z^{\mp} \pm 12M \frac{dZ^{\mp}}{dr_*}.$$

== Reflection and transmission coefficients ==
Reflection coefficients due to Regge-Wheeler-Zerilli potentials

Here $V^{\pm}$ is always positive and the problem is one of reflection and transmission of waves incident from $r_*\rightarrow \infty$ to $r_*\rightarrow -\infty$. The problem is essentially the same as that of a reflection and transmission problem by a potential barrier in quantum mechanics. Let the incident wave with unit amplitude be $e^{+i\sigma r_*}$, then the asymptotic behaviours of the solution are given by

$$Z^{\pm} = e^{+i\sigma r_*} + R^{\pm} e^{-i\sigma r_*} \quad \text{as} \quad r_*\rightarrow +\infty$$
$$Z^{\pm} =  T^{\pm} e^{i\sigma r_*} \quad \text{as} \quad r_*\rightarrow -\infty$$

where $R=R(\sigma)$ and $T=T(\sigma)$ are respectively the reflection and transmission amplitudes. In the second equation, we have imposed the physical requirement that no waves emerge from the event horizon.

The reflection and transmission coefficients are thus defined as

$$\mathcal{R}^{\pm}=|R^{\pm}|^2, \quad \mathcal{T}^{\pm}=|T^{\pm}|^2$$

subjected to the condition $\mathcal{R}^{\pm}+ \mathcal{T}^{\pm}=1.$ Because of the inherent connection between the two equations as outlined in the previous section, it turns out

$$T^+=T^-,\quad R^+ = e^{i\delta}R^-, \quad   e^{i\delta}=\frac{n(n+1)-3i\sigma M}{n(n+1)+3 i\sigma M}$$

and thus consequently, since $R^+$ and $R^-$ differ only in their phases, we get

$$\mathcal{T}\equiv \mathcal{T}^{+}=\mathcal{T}^{-}, \quad \mathcal{R}\equiv\mathcal{R}^{+}=\mathcal{R}^{-}.$$

It is clear from the figure for the reflection coefficient that small-frequency perturbations are readily reflected by the black hole whereas large-frequency ones are absorbed by the black hole. The transition arises around the fundamental quasi-normal mode frequency (see below) for each multipole.

== Quasi-normal modes ==
Quasi-normal modes correspond to pure tones of the black hole. These tones are excited when arbitrary, but small, perturbations impinge on a black hole, such as an object falling into it, accretion of matter surrounding it, the last stage of slightly aspherical collapse, the last stage of a binary merger etc. Unlike the reflection and transmission coefficient problem, quasi-normal modes are characterised by complex-valued $\sigma$'s with the convention $\mathrm{Re}\{\sigma\}>0$. The required boundary conditions are

$$Z^{\pm} = A^{\pm} e^{-i\sigma r_*} \quad \text{as} \quad r_*\rightarrow +\infty$$
$$Z^{\pm} =   e^{i\sigma r_*} \quad \text{as} \quad r_*\rightarrow -\infty$$

indicating that we have purely outgoing waves with amplitude $A^{\pm}$ and purely ingoing waves at the horizon.

The problem becomes an eigenvalue problem. The quasi-normal modes are of damping type in time, although these waves diverge in space as $r^*\to\pm\infty$ (this is due to the implicit assumption that the perturbation in quasi-normal modes is 'infinite' in the remote past). Again because of the relation mentioned between the two problem, the spectrum of $Z^+$ and $Z^-$ are identical and thus it enough to consider the spectrum of $Z^-.$ The problem is simplified by introducing

$$Z^-=\exp\left(i\int^{r_*} \phi \,dr_*\right).$$

The nonlinear eigenvalue problem is given by

$$i \frac{d\phi}{dr_*} + \sigma^2 - \phi^2 - V^-=0, \quad \phi(-\infty)=+\sigma, \quad \phi(+\infty) =-\sigma.$$

The solution is found to exist only for a discrete set of values of $\sigma.$ This equation also implies the identity

$$-2i\sigma + \int_{-\infty}^{+\infty} (\sigma^2-\phi^2) dr_* = \int_{-\infty}^{+\infty} V^- dr_* = \frac{4n+1}{4M}.$$

== See also ==
- Chandrasekhar–Page equations
- Teukolsky equations
