= The Stag Convergence =

- The Big Bang Theory episode
- Episode no.: Season 5 Episode 22
- Directed by: Peter Chakos
- Story by: Bill Prady; Steve Holland; Eric Kaplan
- Teleplay by: Chuck Lorre; Steven Molaro; Jim Reynolds
- Production code: 3X6872
- Original air date: April 26, 2012
- Running time: 22 minutes

Guest appearances
- Kevin Sussman as Stuart Bloom; John Ross Bowie as Barry Kripke; Wil Wheaton as himself

Episode chronology
← Previous "The Hawking Excitation"	Next → "The Launch Acceleration"
- The Big Bang Theory season 5

"The Stag Convergence" is the 22nd episode of the fifth season of the American sitcom The Big Bang Theory. The episode premiered on April 26, 2012, on CBS. In it, the main characters go to the bachelor party to celebrate Howard (Simon Helberg) and Bernadette's (Melissa Rauch) upcoming marriage. At the party, a drunk Raj (Kunal Nayyar) reveals some information about Howard's past sexual encounters. When Bernadette picks them up from the party, Howard and Rajesh find out that Bernadette learned about Howard's sexual history from a video posted on the internet.

The story and concept of the episode was written by series co-creator Bill Prady, and writers Steve Holland and Eric Kaplan. The teleplay was written by co-creator Chuck Lorre, and writers Steven Molaro and Jim Reynolds. Peter Chakos served as director. Upon airing, "The Stag Convergence" garnered 12.65 million viewers in the United States and 4.1 Nielsen rating in the 18–49 demographic. The episode received mixed reviews from television critics, noting that it was not as heavy on jokes compared to other episodes in the series.

== Plot ==
Sheldon, Leonard, Howard and Raj discuss Howard's bachelor party, with Howard reaffirming to Raj that strippers are banned from the party. Raj then suggests a wine tasting train trip through Napa Valley but, despite Sheldon's approval, this idea is rejected as well. Meanwhile, Amy is filming Bernadette and Penny making wedding party gifts. She begins to ask a question about consummation but Penny tells her to ask something normal, such as what Bernadette's married name will be.

The bachelor party proves to be a failure, with Sheldon's jokes falling flat and Barry Kripke complaining about the lack of strippers. A drunk Raj then begins his speech by saying that he was lonely when he first moved to America until he met Howard. He then tells embarrassing stories about Howard's sexual history, including how Howard lost his virginity to his second cousin, had a threesome with Raj and a Sailor Moon cosplayer at ComicCon and slept with a prostitute.

Later, Bernadette comes to drive Howard and Raj home and reveals that Wil Wheaton (playing himself) put a video of Raj's speech on YouTube. Howard had previously claimed that he told her about every girl he had been with, but had not done so. Back at her apartment, she questions whether she can marry him. She is also upset at Penny, who originally set her up with Howard.

Howard shows up at Bernadette's apartment and asks Penny to give Bernadette his heartfelt and genuine apology, which reduces Penny to tears. Bernadette overhears this and forgives him. Amy is relieved that she is still a maid of honor and the four hug. Leonard later meets Penny in the laundry room and wants to have sex, but Penny declines.

== Production ==
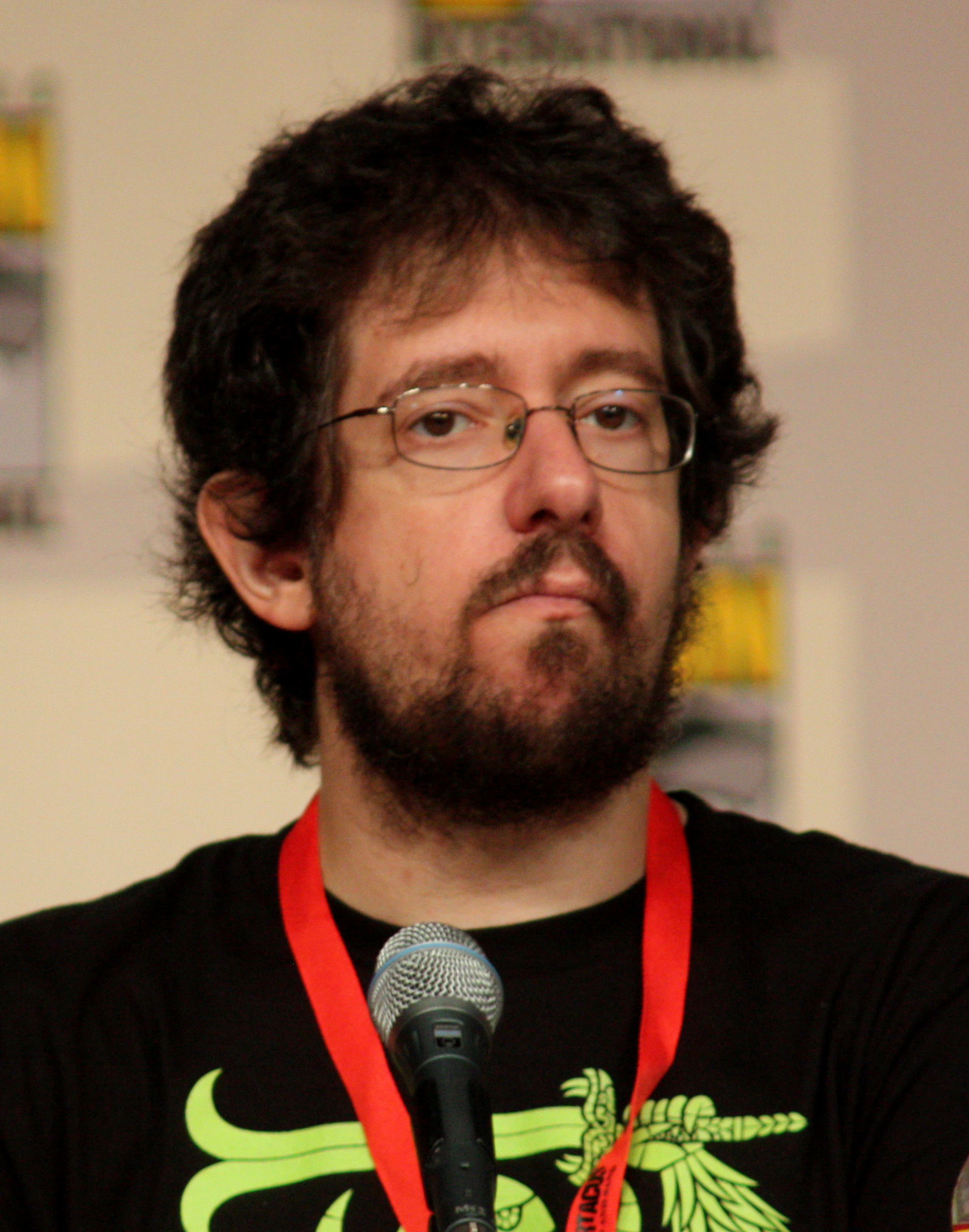
Eric Kaplan helped write the story for the episode.

The story and concept for "The Stag Convergence" were written by series co-creator Bill Prady, and writers Steve Holland and Eric Kaplan. The teleplay for the episode was written by series co-creator Chuck Lorre and writers Steven Molaro and Jim Reynolds. It was directed by Peter Chakos and filmed on March 27, 2012. (Note: The episode was the 22nd to be filmed in the season. "3/27/14" was the 22nd date listed on TVTickets for season 5 of The Big Bang Theory.) Guest stars included Kevin Sussman as Stuart Bloom, John Ross Bowie as Barry Kripke, and Wil Wheaton as himself. Ian Scott Rudolph returns as Captain Sweatpants along with actors Jesse Heiman and Zack Sonnenberg at the bachelor party as guests in non-speaking roles.

== Reception ==
=== Ratings ===
The episode was originally broadcast on April 26, 2012, followed by Rules of Engagement. Upon airing, "The Stag Convergence" garnered 12.65 million viewers while airing simultaneously with American Idol on Fox, Community on NBC, Missing on ABC and The Vampire Diaries on The CW. With the exception of American Idol, which had 14.87 million viewers, it beat all other programs in its timeslot. Under the Nielsen rating system, the episode received a 4.1 rating and a 13 percent share among adults between the ages of 18 and 49.

In Canada, the episode aired on the same date on CTV Total and 3.17 million households watched it; the episode was the most watched TV show that week. In the United Kingdom, it aired on May 24, 2012, and garnered 1.444 million E4 viewers. On E4 +1, the show was watched by 0.403 million viewers, giving the episode a total of 1.847 million viewers on the night of its first broadcast and making it most watched that night on both channels. In Australia, it aired on Nine Network on May 22, 2012, and 1.27 million viewed the show; the episode was ranked second on the network and second overall that night.

=== Critical reception ===
Oh my god, Howard! That's the most beautiful thing I've ever heard. And it came out of you.

— Penny: her quote was praised by Carla Day of TV Fanatic

The episode received mixed critical reception. Oliver Sava of The A.V. Club graded it a C, claiming that Amy "gets some of the episode's best lines". Sava noted that it "has a lot of Jew humor, and Mayim Bialik and Simon Helberg are the perfect people to deliver it", although disliked Barry and Wil and said that "their jokes wore thin fairly quickly". R.L. Shaffer of IGN also gave the episode a mixed review, saying that The Big Bang Theory has become more "cynical and chauvinistic" towards female characters. Shaffer also noted he was more frustrated about "the revelation that Bernadette wouldn't allow strippers at Wolowitz's bachelor party", as it is never explained why. Shaffer claimed that there were "only a few laughs here and there" and scored the episode 5.5 out of 10, classifying it as "mediocre".

Carla Day of TV Fanatic gave a more positive review, rating the episode 4.5 out of 5, and praising Penny's response to Howard's apology and claiming that it "provided a nice chuckle." Jill Mader of Inside Pulse also gave the episode a more positive review, praising "that the episode ended with a really sweet moment for Howard as, after all, he is a character who doesn't often get to be sweet" and claimed that it was "definitely about people changing and moving forward, and The Big Bang Theory has done a great job of emotionally maturing many of their characters over the past couple seasons". Despite this, she said that "the episode wasn't as funny as [she had] hoped it would be" and "felt like there was more potential in Howard's bachelor party than just revealing some unflattering secrets to Bernadette." Robin Pierson of The TV Critic rated the episode as 56 out of 100, describing Howard's "little speech" as "very well written and performed". However, he considered most of the comedy "generic", especially in regards to the jokes about Jewish stereotypes and Penny's dismissal of Leonard. Overall, Pierson said it "wasn't the strongest episode of comedy" and "wasn't a particularly interesting episode until the end".
