= God, the Universe and Everything Else =

- DVD cover
- Directed by: Hector Stewart
- Starring: Stephen Hawking; Arthur C. Clarke; Carl Sagan
- Production company: Central Independent Television
- Release date: 1988
- Running time: 51 minutes
- Country: United Kingdom
- Language: English

God, the Universe and Everything Else is a 1988 documentary featuring Stephen Hawking, Arthur C. Clarke and Carl Sagan, and moderated by Magnus Magnusson. They discuss the Big Bang theory, God and the possibility of extraterrestrial life.

== See also ==
- Stephen Hawking in popular culture
