= Cameo appearance =

Brief appearance in performing art

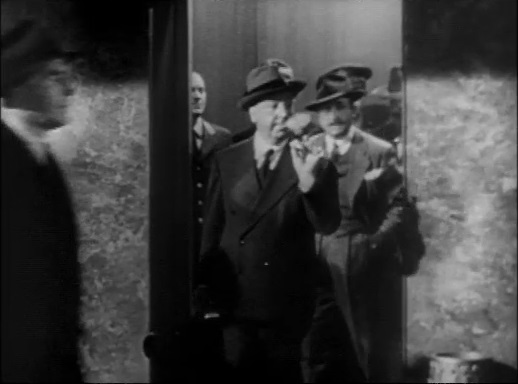
The 1945 psychological drama film Spellbound features a cameo by its director, Alfred Hitchcock, in which he exits an elevator. Hitchcock is known for his small cameos in his films.

A cameo appearance, also called a cameo role or just cameo (/ˈkæmioʊ/), is a brief guest appearance of a well-known person or character in a work of the performing arts. These roles are generally small, many of them non-speaking ones, and are commonly either appearances in a work in which they hold some special significance (such as actors from an original movie appearing in its remake) or renowned people making uncredited appearances. Short appearances by celebrities, film directors, politicians, athletes or musicians are common. A crew member of the movie or show playing a minor role can be referred to as a cameo role as well, such as director Alfred Hitchcock who made frequent cameo appearances in his films.

== Concept ==
Originally, in the 1920s, a "cameo role" meant "a small character part that stands out from the other minor parts". The Oxford English Dictionary connects this with the meaning "a short literary sketch or portrait", which is based on the literal meaning of "cameo", a miniature carving on a gemstone. More recently, in the late 20th century, a "cameo" has come to refer to any short appearance as a character.

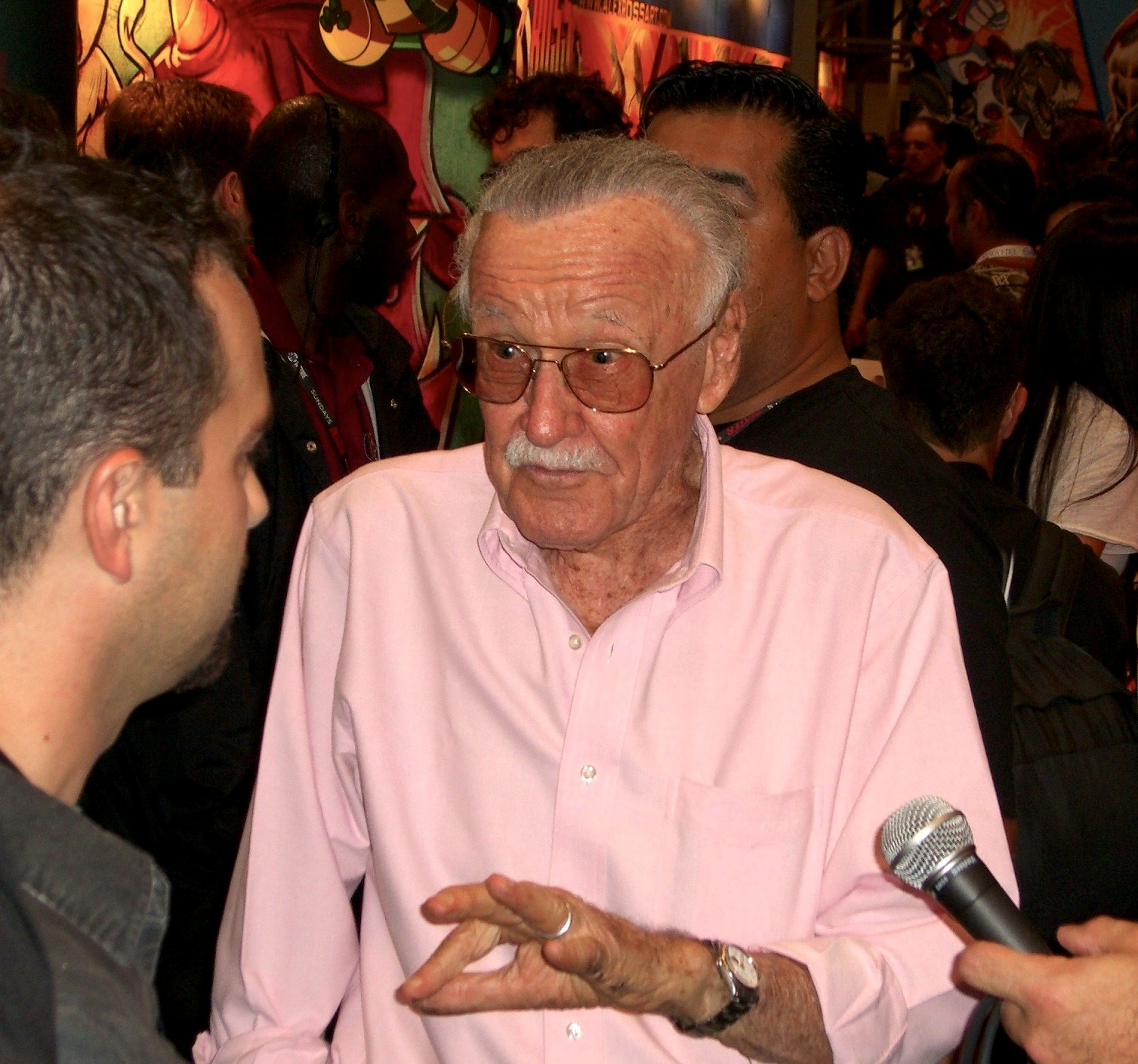
Stan Lee was well known for his cameo appearances throughout most of the Marvel films.

Cameos are generally not credited because of their brevity, or a perceived mismatch between the celebrity's stature and the film or television series in which they are appearing. Many are publicity stunts. Others are acknowledgements of an actor's contribution to an earlier work, as in the case of many film adaptations of television series, or of remakes of earlier films. Others honour artists or celebrities known for work in a particular field, such as comic book writer Stan Lee, who made appearances in every Marvel Cinematic Universe movie up to Avengers: Endgame.

Cameos also occur in novels and other literary works. "Literary cameos" usually involve an established character from another work who makes a brief appearance to establish a shared universe setting, to make a point, or to offer homage. Balzac often employed this practice, as in his Comédie humaine. Sometimes a cameo features a historical person who "drops in" on fictional characters in a historical novel, as when Benjamin Franklin shares a beer with Phillipe Charboneau in The Bastard by John Jakes.

A cameo appearance can be made by the author of a work to put a sort of personal "signature" on a story. Vladimir Nabokov often put himself in his novels, for instance as the very minor character Vivian Darkbloom (an anagram of his name) in Lolita.

== Notable examples ==
=== Film directors ===
Alfred Hitchcock is known for his frequent cameos in his movies, as early as in his third film The Lodger (1927). In Lifeboat, as the action was restricted to the titular lifeboat, Hitchcock appeared in a newspaper ad.

Quentin Tarantino provides brief cameos or small roles in all his movies.

Likewise, Peter Jackson has made brief cameos in all of his movies, except for his first feature-length film Bad Taste in which he played a main character, as well as The Battle of the Five Armies, though a portrait of him appears in the film. For example, he played a peasant eating a carrot in The Fellowship of the Ring and The Desolation of Smaug, a warrior of Rohan in The Two Towers, and a Corsair of Umbar boatswain in The Return of the King. All four were non-speaking "blink and you miss him" appearances, although in the Extended Release version of The Return of the King, his character was given more screen time and his reprise of the carrot eating peasant in The Desolation of Smaug was featured in the foreground in reference to The Fellowship of the Ring. In addition, when he was directing Heavenly Creatures (1994), he appeared as a person bumping who is kissed by one the main characters, and in the Frighteners, Jackson appeared as a man with piercings.

Director Tim Burton briefly appears in his films. He made a short appearance as a street thug who confronts Pee-wee in the back alley in Pee-wee's Big Adventure, and a visitor at the fair in Blackpool who gets a skeleton thrown at him in Miss Peregrine's Home for Peculiar Children.

Director Martin Scorsese appears in the background of his films as a bystander or an unseen character. In Who's That Knocking at My Door (1967), he played one of the gangsters; he was a lighting crewman in After Hours and a passenger in Taxi Driver. He opened up his film The Color of Money with a monologue on the art of playing pool. In addition, he appeared with his wife and daughter as wealthy New Yorkers in Gangs of New York, and as a theatre-goer and can be heard as a movie projectionist in The Aviator. He also appeared in his 2023 work Killers of the Flower Moon, in a minor role as a radio drama narrator.

In a same way, Roman Polanski appeared as a hired hoodlum in his film Chinatown, slitting Jack Nicholson's nose with the blade of his clasp knife.

F. Gary Gray has made many appearances in the films he has directed including Friday, Set It Off, Law Abiding Citizen, and Straight Outta Compton.

In addition to George Lucas's cameo in Revenge of the Sith, his children were cast in a number of cameo roles across the Star Wars prequels. Amanda and Katie Lucas both had cameo roles as three different characters each across The Phantom Menace, Attack of the Clones and Revenge of the Sith (in addition to Amanda's voicing a fourth character), and Jett Lucas has two cameo roles for different characters in Attack of the Clones and Revenge of the Sith.

=== Actors and writers ===
It's a Mad, Mad, Mad, Mad World (1963), an "epic comedy", features cameos from nearly every popular American comedian alive at the time, including The Three Stooges, Jerry Lewis, Buster Keaton and a voice-only cameo by Selma Diamond.

Anthony Daniels made a cameo appearance in Attack of the Clones, despite already starring in the film. Daniels voiced the droid C-3PO, but also made a brief appearance (revealing the actor's actual face and body) as a patron in the background of the Outlander Club.

"Murder on High C", a 1975 episode of the TV series Get Christie Love!, which starred former Laugh-In cast member Teresa Graves, featured a number of her former cast members, including the villain (Arte Johnson), Johnny Brown, Judy Carne, Henry Gibson, Gary Owens and Joanne Worley.

Won Ton Ton, the Dog Who Saved Hollywood (1976) features cameos by dozens of actors from Hollywood's golden age.

The Player (1992) features cameos from 65 Hollywood actors.

Run for Your Wife (2012) is filled with cameos from 80 of Britain's film and TV stars from the 1960s, '70s and '80s.

Aaron Sorkin also had cameos in some works he wrote: as a bar customer speaking about the law in his debut film screenplay A Few Good Men (1992), as an advertising executive in The Social Network, and as a guest at the inauguration of President Matt Santos in the final episode of The West Wing.

Franco Nero, the actor who portrayed the Django character in the original 1966 film, appears in a bar scene of the Tarantino film Django Unchained. There, he asks Django (Jamie Foxx) to spell his name, which led to the famous promotional tagline for the film - "The 'D' is silent". Franco's character responds simply, "I know."

Many cameos featured in Maverick (1994), directed by Richard Donner. Among them, Danny Glover – Mel Gibson's co-star in the Lethal Weapon franchise also directed by Donner – appears as the lead bank robber. He and Maverick (Gibson) share a scene where they look as if they knew each other, but then shake it off. As Glover makes his escape with the money, he mutters "I'm too old for this shit", his character's catchphrase in the Lethal Weapon films. In addition, a strain of the main theme from Lethal Weapon plays in the score when Glover is revealed. Actress Margot Kidder made a cameo appearance in the same film as a robbed villager: she had previously starred as Lois Lane in Donner's Superman (1978).

Ben Stiller, Vince Vaughn, Owen Wilson, Luke Wilson and Will Ferrell have made appearances in so many of the same films (whether as lead characters or cameos) that USA Today coined the term "Frat Pack" to name the group. Actor Adam Sandler is also known for frequently casting fellow Saturday Night Live performers (including Rob Schneider and David Spade) in various roles in his films (as well as making cameo appearances of his own in theirs, most of which he co-produces). Sam Raimi frequently uses his brother Ted and Bruce Campbell in his films.

The animated series The Adventures of Tintin featured its author Hergé in all the episodes.

Stephen King is famous for making short cameo appearances in almost every movie based on his novels.

An Adventure in Space and Time, a drama about how Doctor Who began, features many actors from the show's past, including two past companions in a party scene, another as a mother calling her children in for dinner and a fourth in a car park at the BBC as a guard.

In the movie adaptation of Les Miserables, Colm Wilkinson, who originated the role of Jean Valjean in the West End and on Broadway, made a cameo as the Bishop of Digne.

In the Soviet film Moscow Does Not Believe in Tears, Innokenty Smoktunovsky appeared for a minute as himself.

In Percy Jackson and the Olympians, author Rick Riordan appeared as a teacher in the first episode.

=== Other ===
Films based on actual events occasionally include cameo guest appearances by the people portrayed in them. In The Pursuit of Happyness, Chris Gardner made a cameo at the end. 24 Hour Party People, a film about Tony Wilson, has a cameo by the real Tony Wilson and many other notable people. In the film Apollo 13, James Lovell (the real commander of that flight) and his wife Marilyn appeared next to the actors playing them (Tom Hanks and Kathleen Quinlan respectively), and Chuck Yeager, whose story is told in the early part of the film, appears in a cameo in the airfield bar. Domino Harvey made a short appearance in the credits of Domino, while the real Erin Brockovich had a cameo as a waitress named Julia in the eponymous movie (where her role is played by the actress Julia Roberts). Sophie Wilson had a cameo as a barmaid in Micro Men, which shows her work for Acorn Computers. In a flashback sequence in Fear and Loathing in Las Vegas, Raoul Duke (played by Johnny Depp) runs into the real-life Hunter S. Thompson, upon whom the character of Duke is based, leading him to remark "There I was...mother of God, there I am! Holy fuck."

Stephen Hawking in popular culture lists more than a dozen appearances of the scientist playing himself.

Maria Von Trapp made an uncredited brief cameo appearance in the film version of her life, The Sound of Music. She appeared in the background during the song "I Have Confidence" with her daughter Rosmarie and stepson Werner Von Trapp.

Jacqueline Susann, author of the best-selling novel Valley of the Dolls, appears as a TV reporter in a brief scene in the film based upon her novel. Similarly, Peter Benchley would appear as a TV reporter in the Jaws movie, based on his novel of the same name.

Tom Morello, American guitarist and musician, made an appearance in the Marvel film Iron Man (2008), in which he also participated in the soundtrack.

Elon Musk and Larry Ellison, both founders of large technology companies, were featured in cameos in Iron Man 2 (2010).

The king of Sweden, Carl XVI Gustaf, was in the children's program Mika (Mika och renen Ossian på äventyr) when Mika was in Stockholm with his reindeer.

In The Wolf of Wall Street (2013), the real Jordan Belfort appeared as an emcee to introduce Leonardo DiCaprio, who played Belfort, in the final scene.

Boxer Roberto Duran and his wife Felicidad made a cameo appearance towards the end of the film Hands of Stone, about Duran's life.

In The Big Short, the real investor Michael Burry appeared as an employee of his hedge fund "Scion Capital" while answering the phone saying "Doctor Burry's office".

An unusual example of a famous non-actor being given a small but speaking fictional role occurred in the Star Trek: The Next Generation episode "Second Chances." Dr. Mae Jemison, an astronaut, the first Black woman in space, and a long-time fan of Star Trek, was offered the opportunity to appear on the show. She was given the role of a Starfleet crewmember and a few lines, thus becoming the first real-life astronaut to appear on Star Trek. Somewhat likewise King Abdullah II of Jordan appeared briefly in a non-speaking role the Star Trek: Voyager episode "Investigations".

== See also ==
- Allusion
- Bit part
- Extra
- Crossover fiction
- Self-insertion
