= Chandrasekhar–Page equations =

Massive fermion wave equation in Kerr spacetime

Chandrasekhar–Page equations describe the wave function of the spin-1/2 massive particles, that resulted by seeking a separable solution to the Dirac equation in Kerr metric or Kerr–Newman metric. In 1976, Subrahmanyan Chandrasekhar showed that a separable solution can be obtained from the Dirac equation in Kerr metric. Later, Don Page extended this work to Kerr–Newman metric, that is applicable to charged black holes. In his paper, Page notices that N. Toop also derived his results independently, as informed to him by Chandrasekhar. Incidentally, while solving this problem, Chandrasekhar discovered a separable solution to the Dirac equation in flat space-time in oblate spheroidal coordinates for the first time.

By assuming a normal mode decomposition of the form $e^{i(m\phi-\omega t)}$ (with $m$ being the azimuthal component of the particle angular momentum and takes half integer values and with $\omega$ being the frequency) for the time and the azimuthal component of the spherical polar coordinates $(r,\theta,\phi)$, Chandrasekhar showed that the four Dirac spinor components of the wave function,

$$\begin{bmatrix} F_1(r,\theta) \\ F_2(r,\theta) \\ G_1(r,\theta) \\ G_2(r,\theta)\end{bmatrix}e^{i(m\phi-\omega t)}$$

can be expressed as product of radial and angular functions. The separation of variables is effected for the functions $f_1=(r-ia\cos\theta)F_1$, $f_2=(r-ia\cos\theta)F_2$, $g_1=(r+ia\cos\theta)G_1$ and $g_2=(r+ia\cos\theta)G_2$ (with $a$ being the angular momentum per unit mass of the black hole) as in

$$f_1(r,\theta) = R_{-}(r)S_{-}(\theta), \quad f_2(r,\theta) = R_{+}(r)S_{+}(\theta),$$
$$g_1(r,\theta) = R_{+}(r)S_{-}(\theta), \quad g_2(r,\theta) = R_{-}(r)S_{+}(\theta).$$

== Chandrasekhar–Page angular equations ==
The angular functions satisfy the coupled eigenvalue equations,

$$\begin{align}
\mathcal{L}_{\frac{1}{2}} S_{+} &= -(\lambda - a\mu \cos\theta )S_{-}, \\
\mathcal{L}_{\frac{1}{2}}^{\dagger} S_{-} &= +(\lambda + a\mu \cos\theta )S_{+},
\end{align}$$

where $\mu$ is the particle's rest mass (measured in units so that it is the inverse of the Compton wavelength), and

$$\mathcal{L}_n = \frac{{d}}{{d}\theta} + ( m \csc\theta - a\omega\sin\theta)  + n\cot \theta,$$
$$\mathcal{L}_n^{\dagger} = \frac{{d}}{{d}\theta} - (m \csc\theta- a\omega\sin\theta)  + n\cot\theta.$$

Eliminating $S_{+}(\theta)$ between the two equations, one obtains

$$\left(\mathcal{L}_{\frac{1}{2}}\mathcal{L}_{\frac{1}{2}}^{\dagger} + \frac{a\mu\sin\theta}{\lambda + a\mu\cos\theta} \mathcal{L}_{\frac{1}{2}}^{\dagger} + \lambda^2 - a^2\mu^2\cos^2\theta\right) S_{-} = 0.$$

The function $S_{+}$ satisfies the adjoint equation, that can be obtained from the above equation by replacing $\theta$ with $\pi-\theta$. The boundary conditions for these second-order differential equations are that $S_{-}$(and $S_{+}$) be regular at $\theta=0$ and $\theta=\pi$. The eigenvalue problem presented here in general requires numerical integrations for it to be solved.

=== Properties and limiting solutions ===
The eigenvalue problem depends on two continuous parameters, namely $a\omega$ and $a\mu$. For a given $a\omega$ and $a\mu$, the eigenstates are characterised by three discrete numbers: the particle angular momentum, $j=1/2,3/2,\dots$, its azimuthal component $m=-j,-j+1,\dots,j-1,j$ and the parity $\mathcal{P}=\pm 1.$ The spectrum elements may then be explicitly labelled as

$$S_\pm = {}_{s=\pm\frac{1}{2}} S_{j,m,\mathcal{P}}^{(a\omega,a\mu)}, \lambda = \lambda_{j,m,\mathcal{P}}^{(a\omega,a\mu)}.$$

The eigenvalue $\lambda$ has the physical interpretation of being the square root of the generalised total anagular momentum squared. The knowledge of the spectrum in the positive quadrant $a\omega>0,a\mu>0$ is sufficient to determine the full spectrum, as implied by the symmetry:

$$\lambda_{j,m,\mathcal{P}}^{(a\omega,a\mu)}=-\lambda_{j,-m,-\mathcal{P}}^{(-a\omega,a\mu)}=-\lambda_{j,m,-\mathcal{P}}^{(a\omega,-a\mu)}=\lambda_{j,-m,\mathcal{P}}^{(-a\omega,-a\mu)}.$$

Furthermore

$${}_{s} S_{j,m,\mathcal{P}}^{(a\omega,a\mu)}(\theta) = (-1)^{s-1/2}{}_{s} S_{j,m,-\mathcal{P}}^{(a\omega,-a\mu)}(\Theta)=\mathcal{P}(-1)^{m-1/2}{}_{-s} S_{j,-m,-\mathcal{P}}^{(-a\omega,a\mu)}(\theta)=\mathcal{P}(-1)^{j+m}{}_{-s} S_{j,m,\mathcal{P}}^{(a\omega,a\mu)}(\pi-\theta)$$

and the combinations thereof.

Non-rotating black hole (Schwarzschild black hole) $a=0$: The problem can be solved explicitly. The eigenvalues and eigenfunctions are given by

$$\lambda_{j,m,\mathcal{P}}^{(0,0)}=\mathcal{P}(j+1/2),$$
$$\begin{bmatrix} {}_{+1/2} S_{j,m,\mathcal{P}}^{(0,0)}(\theta)\\ {}_{-1/2} S_{j,m,\mathcal{P}}^{(0,0)}(\theta)\end{bmatrix} = A\begin{bmatrix}\cos\frac{\theta}{2} & \sin\frac{\theta}{2}\\-\sin\frac{\theta}{2} & \cos\frac{\theta}{2}\end{bmatrix}\begin{bmatrix}P_{j+\mathcal{P}/2}^{m+1/2}(\cos\theta) \\ c_{j,m,\mathcal{P}}^{(0,0)}P_{j+\mathcal{P}/2}^{m-1/2}(\cos\theta)\end{bmatrix},$$

where $P$ is the associated Legendre polynomials and

$$c_{j,m,\mathcal{P}}^{(0,0)}=\mathcal{P}(j+\mathcal{P}/2+1/2)-m, \quad A = \sqrt{\frac{(j-m)!}{2\pi(j+m)!}}.$$

Special case $\omega=\pm \mu$: For the special case where $\omega=+ \mu$, the solutions are given by

$$\lambda_{j,m,\mathcal{P}}^{(a\omega,a\omega)}=-\frac{1}{2}+\mathcal{P}\sqrt{(j+\mathcal{P}/2+1/2)^2-2ma\omega+a^2\omega^2},$$
$$\begin{bmatrix} {}_{+1/2} S_{j,m,\mathcal{P}}^{(0,0)}(\theta)\\ {}_{-1/2} S_{j,m,\mathcal{P}}^{(0,0)}(\theta)\end{bmatrix} = A\begin{bmatrix}\cos\frac{\theta}{2} & \sin\frac{\theta}{2}\\-\sin\frac{\theta}{2} & \cos\frac{\theta}{2}\end{bmatrix}\begin{bmatrix}P_{j+\mathcal{P}/2}^{m+1/2}(\cos\theta) \\ c_{j,m,\mathcal{P}}^{(a\omega,a\omega)}P_{j+\mathcal{P}/2}^{m-1/2}(\cos\theta)\end{bmatrix},$$

where

$$c_{j,m,\mathcal{P}}^{(a\omega,a\omega)}=[(j+\mathcal{P}/2+1/2)^2-m^2]/(\lambda_{j,m,\mathcal{P}}^{(a\omega,a\omega)}+m+1/2-a\omega),$$
$$A = \sqrt{\frac{(j+\mathcal{P}/2+1/2)}{2\pi}\frac{(j+\mathcal{P}/2-m-1/2)!}{(j+\mathcal{P}/2+m+1/2)!}\left(1+\frac{\mathcal{P}(m-a\omega)}{\sqrt{(j+\mathcal{P}/2+1/2)^2-2ma\omega+a^2\omega^2}}\right)}\,.$$

When $\omega=-\mu$, we have

$$\lambda_{j,m,\mathcal{P}}^{(a\omega,-a\omega)}=\frac{1}{2}+\mathcal{P}\sqrt{(j+\mathcal{P}/2+1/2)^2-2ma\omega+a^2\omega^2},$$
$$\begin{bmatrix} {}_{+1/2} S_{j,m,\mathcal{P}}^{(a\omega,-a\omega)}(\theta)\\ {}_{-1/2} S_{j,m,\mathcal{P}}^{(0,0)}(\theta)\end{bmatrix} = A\begin{bmatrix}\cos\frac{\theta}{2} & -\sin\frac{\theta}{2}\\\sin\frac{\theta}{2} & \cos\frac{\theta}{2}\end{bmatrix}\begin{bmatrix}P_{j+\mathcal{P}/2}^{m+1/2}(\cos\theta) \\ c_{j,m,\mathcal{P}}^{(a\omega,-a\omega)}P_{j+\mathcal{P}/2}^{m-1/2}(\cos\theta)\end{bmatrix},$$

where

$$c_{j,m,\mathcal{P}}^{(a\omega,-a\omega)}=-[(j-\mathcal{P}/2+1/2)^2-m^2]/(-\lambda_{j,m,\mathcal{P}}^{(a\omega,-a\omega)}+m+1/2-a\omega),$$
$$A = \sqrt{\frac{(j-\mathcal{P}/2+1/2)}{2\pi}\frac{(j-\mathcal{P}/2-m-1/2)!}{(j-\mathcal{P}/2+m+1/2)!}\left(1-\frac{\mathcal{P}(m-a\omega)}{\sqrt{(j-\mathcal{P}/2+1/2)^2-2ma\omega+a^2\omega^2}}\right)}\,.$$

== Chandrasekhar–Page radial equations ==
For convenience, let us write $\sigma=-\omega.$ The radial equations are given by

$$\begin{align}
\Delta^{\frac{1}{2}}\mathcal{D}_{0} R_{-\frac{1}{2}} &= (\lambda +i\mu r)\Delta^{\frac{1}{2}}R_{+\frac{1}{2}}, \\
\Delta^{\frac{1}{2}}\mathcal{D}_{0}^\dagger R_{+\frac{1}{2}} &= (\lambda -i\mu r)R_{-\frac{1}{2}},
\end{align}$$

where $\Delta = r^2 - 2Mr + a^2,$ $M$ is the black hole mass,

$$\mathcal{D}_n = \frac{{d}}{{d}r} + \frac{iK}{\Delta} + 2n \frac{r-M}{\Delta}, \quad \mathcal{D}_n^\dagger = \frac{{d}}{{d}r} - \frac{iK}{\Delta} + 2n \frac{r-M}{\Delta},$$

and $K = (r^2+a^2)\sigma + am.$ Eliminating $\Delta^{\frac{1}{2}} R_{+\frac{1}{2}}$ from the two equations, we obtain

$$\left(\Delta\mathcal{D}_{\frac{1}{2}}^\dagger\mathcal{D}_{0} - \frac{i\mu \Delta}{\lambda + i\mu r}\mathcal{D}_0 -\lambda^2 - \mu^2r^2\right) R_{-\frac{1}{2}} = 0.$$

The function $\Delta^{\frac{1}{2}} R_{+\frac{1}{2}}$ satisfies the corresponding complex-conjugate equation.

=== Reduction to one-dimensional scattering problem ===
The problem of solving the radial functions for a particular eigenvalue of $\lambda$ of the angular functions can be reduced to a problem of reflection and transmission as in one-dimensional Schrödinger equation; see also Regge–Wheeler–Zerilli equations. Particularly, we end up with the equations

$$\left(\frac{d^2}{d\hat r_*^2} + \sigma^2\right) Z^{\pm} = V^{\pm} Z^{\pm},$$

where the Chandrasekhar–Page potentials $V^\pm$ are defined by

$$V^{\pm} = W^2 \pm \frac{dW}{d\hat r_*}, \quad W = \frac{\Delta^{\frac{1}{2}}(\lambda + \mu^2r^2)^{3/2}}{\varpi^2(\lambda^2+\mu^2r^2) + \lambda\mu\Delta/2\sigma},$$

and $\hat r_*=r_*+\tan^{-1}(\mu r/\lambda)/2\sigma$, $r_*=r+2M\ln(r/2M-1)$ is the tortoise coordinate and $\varpi^2 = r^2+a^2 + am/\sigma$. The functions $Z^{\pm}(\hat r_*)$ are defined by $Z^\pm = \psi^+ \pm \psi^-$, where

$$\psi^+ = \Delta^{\frac{1}{2}} R_{+\frac{1}{2}} \mathrm{exp}\left(+\frac{i}{2}\tan^{-1} \frac{\mu r}{\lambda}\right), \quad \psi^- =  R_{-\frac{1}{2}} \mathrm{exp}\left(-\frac{i}{2}\tan^{-1} \frac{\mu r}{\lambda}\right).$$

Unlike the Regge–Wheeler–Zerilli potentials, the Chandrasekhar–Page potentials do not vanish for $r\to\infty$, but has the behaviour

$$V^\pm = \mu^2\left(1 - \frac{2M}{r} + \cdots\right).$$

As a result, the corresponding asymptotic behaviours for $Z^\pm$ as $r\to\infty$ becomes

$$Z^\pm = \mathrm{exp}\left\{\pm i \left[(\sigma^2-\mu^2)^{1/2}r+ \frac{M\mu^2}{(\sigma^2-\mu^2)^{1/2}}\ln \frac{r}{2M}\right]\right\}.$$
