= Hawking star =

Hypothetical star

A Hawking star is a hypothetical type of star that contains a microscopic primordial black hole (PBH) in its core. Postulated by and named after physicist Stephen Hawking, energy in these stars stems from two sources: standard nuclear fusion and the power generated as the central black hole consumes nearby material.

== Overview and history ==
Hawking stars can only exist if primordial black holes—hypothetical objects formed in the ultra-dense early universe—actually exist. Because primordial black holes are a leading candidate for dark matter, discovering a Hawking star would confirm the existence of PBHs and provide strong evidence that they contribute to—or potentially account for—the Universe’s dark matter.

In late 2023, an international team of astrophysicists led by Earl Patrick Bellinger modeled the detailed evolution of Hawking stars. Their research demonstrated that stars capturing sub-planetary or asteroid-mass black holes could survive for billions of years without significant external changes. The survival of hawking stars depends on the creation of an accretion disk, which is in turn driven by angular momentum. If material accumulates above a critical speed, intense feedback completely destroys the star within minutes. Conversely, slow and steady accumulation allows the star to endure and it becomes a Hawking star.

Hawking stars should not be confused with black hole stars.

Ore Gottlieb, an assistant professor of physics at MIT, showed in a research paper that the Hawking-star population is divided between quiet and explosive fates, depending on the star's mass, the black hole's mass, and how long ago the star captured the black hole.

== See also ==
- List of things named after Stephen Hawking
- Thorne–Żytkow object
