= Hawking–Page phase transition =

Thermal phase transition in AdS black holes

In quantum gravity, the Hawking–Page phase transition is phase transition between AdS black holes with radiation and thermal AdS.

Stephen Hawking and Don Page (Hawking & Page (1983)) showed that although AdS black holes can be in stable thermal equilibrium with radiation, they are not the preferred state below a certain critical temperature $T_C$. At this temperature, there will be a first order phase transition where below $T_C$, thermal AdS will become the dominant contribution to the partition function.

The Hawking-Page phase transition between the unstable small black hole to stable large black hole phase is understood as a confinement-deconfinement phase transition in the dual conformal field theory via AdS/CFT correspondence.
