= Black brane =

Generalization of a black hole to higher dimensions

In general relativity, a black brane is a solution of the Einstein field equations that generalizes a black hole solution but it is also extended—and translationally symmetric—in p additional spatial dimensions. That type of solution would be called a black p-brane.

In string theory, the term black brane describes a group of D1-branes that are surrounded by a horizon. With the notion of a horizon in mind as well as identifying points as zero-branes, a generalization of a black hole is a black p-brane. However, many physicists tend to define a black brane separate from a black hole, making the distinction that the singularity of a black brane is not a point like a black hole, but instead a higher dimensional object.

A BPS black brane is similar to a BPS black hole. They both have electric charges. Some BPS black branes have magnetic charges.

The metric for a black p-brane in a n-dimensional spacetime is:
$${d s}^{2} =
\left( \eta_{ab} + \frac{r_s^{n-p-3}}{r^{n-p-3}} u_a u_b \right) d \sigma^a d \sigma^b + \left(1-\frac{r_s^{n-p-3}}{r^{n-p-3}}\right)^{-1} dr^2 + r^2 d \Omega^2_{n-p-2}$$
where:

- η is the (p + 1)-Minkowski metric with signature (−, +, +, +, ...),
- σ are the coordinates for the worldsheet of the black p-brane,
- u is its four-velocity,
- r is the radial coordinate,
- Ω is the metric for a (n − p − 2)-sphere, surrounding the brane.

== Curvatures ==
When
$$ds^2=g_{\mu\nu}dx^\mu dx^\nu + d\Omega_{n+1},$$
the Ricci Tensor becomes
$$\begin{align}
R_{\mu\nu} &= R_{\mu\nu}^{(0)} + \frac{n+1}{r}\Gamma^r_{\mu\nu}, \\
R_{ij} &= \delta_{ij} g_{ii} \left(\frac{n}{r^2}(1-g^{rr}) - \frac{1}{r}(\partial_{\mu} + \Gamma^\nu_{\nu\mu})g^{\mu r}\right),
\end{align}$$
and the Ricci Scalar becomes
$$R = R^{(0)} + \frac{n+1}{r}g^{\mu\nu}\Gamma^r_{\mu\nu} + \frac{n(n+1)}{r^2}(1-g^{rr}) - \frac{n+1}{r}(\partial_\mu g^{\mu r} + \Gamma^\nu_{\nu\mu}g^{\mu r}),$$
where $R_{\mu\nu}^{(0)}$, $R^{(0)}$ are the Ricci Tensor and Ricci scalar of the metric $ds^2=g_{\mu\nu}dx^\mu dx^\nu.$

== Black string ==
A black string is a higher dimensional (D > 4) generalization of a black hole in which the event horizon is topologically equivalent to S^{2} × S^{1} and spacetime is asymptotically M^{d−1} × S^{1}.

Perturbations of black string solutions were found to be unstable for L (the length around S^{1}) greater than some threshold L'. The full non-linear evolution of a black string beyond this threshold might result in a black string breaking up into separate black holes which would coalesce into a single black hole. This scenario seems unlikely because it was realized a black string could not pinch off in finite time, shrinking S^{2} to a point and then evolving to some Kaluza–Klein black hole. When perturbed, the black string would settle into a stable, static non-uniform black string state.

== Kaluza–Klein black hole ==
A Kaluza–Klein black hole is a black brane (generalization of a black hole) in asymptotically flat Kaluza–Klein space, i.e. higher-dimensional spacetime with compact dimensions. They may also be called KK black holes.

== See also ==
- AdS black hole

== Bibliography ==
- Obers, N.A. (2009). "Black Holes in Higher-Dimensional Gravity". Physics of Black Holes. Lecture Notes in Physics. Vol. 769. pp. 211–258. arXiv:0802.0519. doi:10.1007/978-3-540-88460-6_6. ISBN 978-3-540-88459-0. S2CID 14911870.
