= Don Page (physicist) =

Canadian physicist (born 1948)

Don Page FRSC
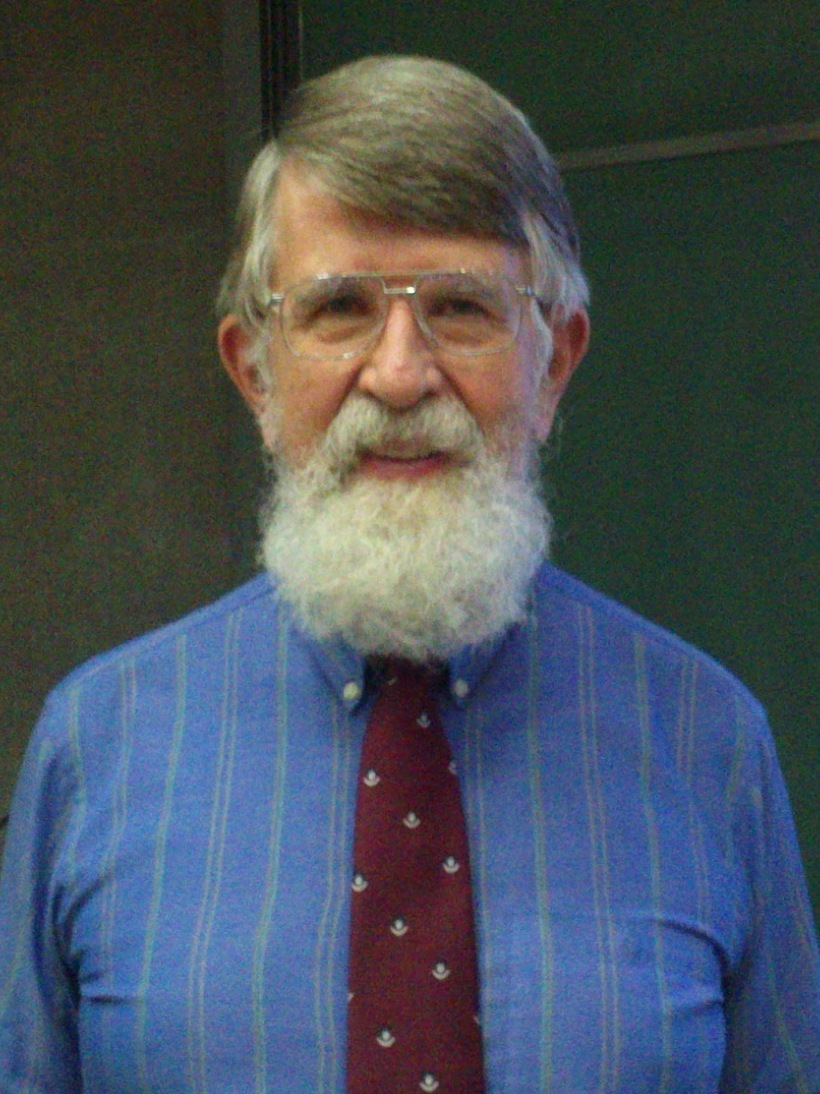
- Page at Department of Physics, National Taiwan University
- Born: December 31, 1948 (age 77); Bethel, Alaska, United States
- Known for: Page curve Page time Hawking–Page phase transition Chandrasekhar–Page equations
- Scientific career
- Education: William Jewell College; California Institute of Technology; University of Cambridge
- Fields: Theoretical physics
- Workplaces: University of Alberta
- Thesis: Accretion into and emission from black holes (1976)
- Doctoral advisor: Kip Thorne; Stephen W. Hawking
- Website: ualberta.ca/science/about-us/contact-us/faculty-directory/don-n,-d-,-page

Don Nelson Page FRSC (born December 31, 1948) is an American-born Canadian theoretical physicist at the University of Alberta, Canada.

== Work ==
Page's work focuses on quantum cosmology and theoretical gravitational physics, and he is noted for being a doctoral student of Stephen Hawking, who was at Caltech during 1974-1975, in addition to publishing several journal articles with him. Page got his BA at William Jewell College in the United States in 1971, attaining an MS in 1972 and a PhD in 1976 at Caltech.

His professional career started as a research assistant in Cambridge from 1976-1979, followed by an assistant professorship at Penn State from 1979-1983, and then an associate professor at Penn State until 1986 before taking on the title of professor in 1986. Page spent four more years at Penn State before moving to become a professor at the University of Alberta in Canada in 1990.

In 1993, he argued that if a black hole starts in a pure quantum state and evaporates completely by a unitary process, the von Neumann entropy of the Hawking radiation initially increases and then decreases back to zero when the black hole has disappeared. This is known as the Page curve, and the turnover point of the curve the Page time. For many researchers, deriving the Page curve is synonymous with solving the famous black hole information paradox.

== Awards and honors ==
In 2012, Page became a Fellow of the Royal Society of Canada.

== Religious views ==
Page is an Evangelical Christian. In commenting on the debate between William Lane Craig and Sean Carroll in 2014, he states in a guest post on Carroll's website that: "...in view of all the evidence, including both the elegance of the laws of physics, the existence of orderly sentient experiences, and the historical evidence, I do believe that God exists and think the world is actually simpler if it contains God than it would have been without God." In the same post he criticises William Lane Craig's Kalam Cosmological Argument, saying that it "is highly dubious metaphysically, depending on contingent intuitions [i.e. the first premise] we have developed from living in a universe with relatively simple laws of physics and with a strong thermodynamic arrow of time."

== See also ==
- Problem of time
