= Hawking Index =

Measure of how far into a book people read

The Hawking Index (HI) is a mock mathematical measure on how far people will, on average, read through a book before giving up. It was invented by American mathematician Jordan Ellenberg, who created it in a blog for The Wall Street Journal in 2014. The index is named after English physicist Stephen Hawking, whose book A Brief History of Time has been dubbed "the most unread book of all time".

== Calculation ==
Ellenberg's method of calculating the index draws on the "popular highlights", the five most highlighted passages marked by Amazon Kindle readers of each title. A wide spread of highlights throughout the work means that most readers will have read the entire book, resulting in a high on the index. If the spread of highlights occurs only at the beginning of the book, then it means that fewer people will have read the book completely and it will thus score low on the index. When the index was created, this information was easier to access, as "popular highlights" were available to everyone, but since then this information has only been made available to people who buy the books on Kindle.

== Hawking Index scores ==
When Ellenberg first used the index, he used the following books as his examples.

Book title	Author	Hawking Index
Hard Choices	Hillary Clinton	1.9%
Capital in the Twenty-First Century	Thomas Piketty	2.4%
Infinite Jest	David Foster Wallace	6.4%
A Brief History of Time	Stephen Hawking	6.6%
Thinking, Fast and Slow	Daniel Kahneman	6.8%
Lean In	Sheryl Sandberg	12.3%
Flash Boys	Michael Lewis	21.7%
Fifty Shades of Grey	E. L. James	25.9%
The Great Gatsby	F. Scott Fitzgerald	28.3%
Catching Fire	Suzanne Collins	43.4%
The Goldfinch	Donna Tartt	98.5%
