= The Hawking Excitation =

- The Big Bang Theory episode
- Episode no.: Season 5 Episode 21
- Directed by: Mark Cendrowski
- Story by: Bill Prady, Steven Molaro &; Steve Holland
- Teleplay by: Chuck Lorre, Eric Kaplan &; Maria Ferrari
- Production code: 3X6871
- Original air date: April 5, 2012
- Running time: 20 minutes

Guest appearances
- Stephen Hawking as himself; Carol Ann Susi as Mrs. Wolowitz

Episode chronology
← Previous "The Transporter Malfunction"	Next → "The Stag Convergence"
- The Big Bang Theory season 5

"The Hawking Excitation" is the 21st episode of the fifth season of The Big Bang Theory that first aired on CBS on April 5, 2012. It is the 108th episode overall. After learning that Stephen Hawking is coming to lecture at Caltech, Howard (Simon Helberg) is hired to maintain his wheelchair equipment. When Sheldon (Jim Parsons) discovers this, he is desperate to meet Hawking. Howard says he can, but only if he completes a humiliating series of tasks.

The final scene of the episode features a cameo appearance by cosmologist Stephen Hawking, the third high-profile guest star in season 5. The episode had 13.29 million viewers in America and garnered mixed reviews.

== Plot ==
Raj and Leonard are at lunch with Howard when he gets an e-mail from Stephen Hawking's office; Hawking is coming to lecture at Caltech and needs an engineer to help maintain his wheelchair. Sheldon is a big fan of Hawking, so Howard considers bringing Sheldon along to meet him. Sheldon then arrives and says that he has revolutionized understanding of the Higgs boson particle; he explains it to Raj and Leonard but ignores Howard, thinking he wouldn't understand.

Howard, feeling insulted, refuses to introduce Sheldon to Hawking, even after Sheldon pleads. The next day, Howard talks about his work with Hawking to frustrate Sheldon. After Sheldon begs, Howard agrees to give Sheldon's paper on the Higgs boson to Hawking on the condition that Sheldon performs several tasks for him.

The first task is to polish Howard's belt buckles. Howard tends to stand too close to the urinal and urine often splashes back onto the buckles. Sheldon is given a black light and several dozen belt buckles to clean. Sheldon performs the task flawlessly. For his second task, Sheldon is forced to wear a French maid costume, that Howard originally bought for his girlfriend Bernadette, in the cafeteria at Caltech. Everyone laughs at him, enjoying his embarrassment.

When Penny goes to do her laundry, she finds Sheldon washing Howard's panties. Sheldon explains that he is being punished for being, according to Howard, a "condescending jerk", and asks Penny if she thinks he is condescending. Penny agrees with Howard.

Howard shows Bernadette a picture of Sheldon wearing the French maid costume. She thinks Howard is being too cruel and says that Sheldon is unaware of how mean he is. Howard agrees to stop making Sheldon perform tasks. Howard's mother interrupts to remind Bernadette that they made plans to go dress shopping; Bernadette says that she cannot make it, but that Sheldon will accompany her instead. Sheldon is forced to go shopping with Mrs. Wolowitz.

Sheldon's final task is to give Howard a compliment about his work: he says that Howard is good at his job, although Sheldon does not consider his work to be "worth doing". Howard reveals that he gave Hawking the paper three days ago. Sheldon finally gets to meet Hawking in person. When they meet, Hawking points out an arithmetic error in Sheldon's paper that makes the whole paper incorrect, causing Sheldon to faint.

== Production ==
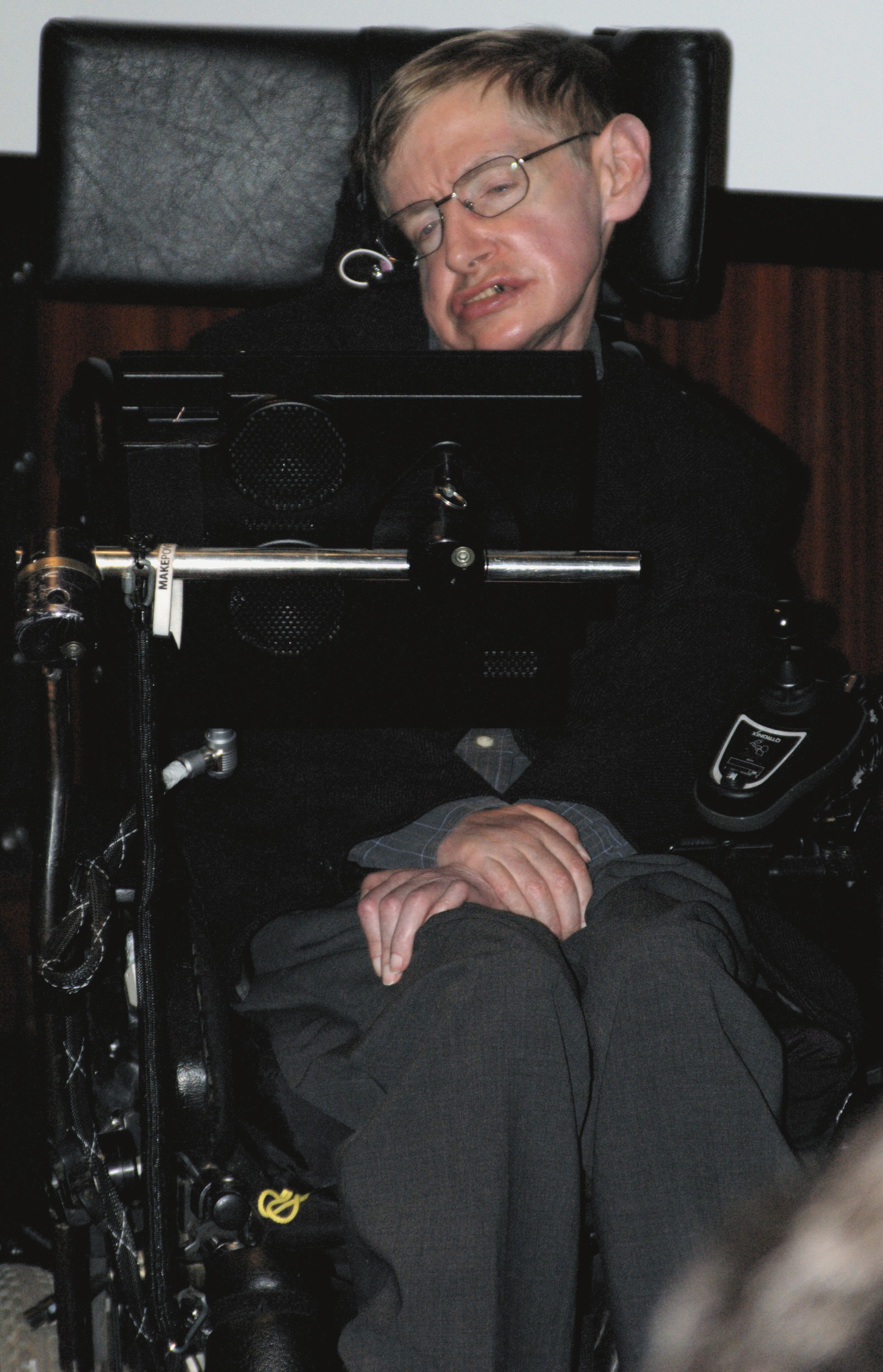
Professor Stephen Hawking appears at the end of the episode.

Bill Prady
(@billprady)
tweeted:

On my way to shoot a scene with a super-secret, super-cool guest star for episode 521.

9 Mar 2012

Stephen Hawking has been mentioned several times on the show, including in the Pilot. Hawking has appeared on comedy television shows previously: he did the voice-over for cartoon versions of himself in Futurama, and in four episodes of The Simpsons.

On March 9, 2012, Bill Prady announced that a "super-secret, super-cool guest star" would appear on the show. On March 12, 2012, CBS announced that Hawking would be guest starring on the show on April 5. Photos of Hawking's appearance were published by The Hollywood Reporter on April 2.

Hawking had been asked to appear on the show previously but was too ill to do so. Bill Prady stated that Stephen Hawking was always their "dream guest star" for the show, but that Hawking appearing was "a long shot of astronomical proportions". Hawking was a fan of The Big Bang Theory and requested to watch a rehearsal of the episode after filming his scene. Simon Helberg, who plays Howard, does an impression of Hawking's voice in the episode; he felt slightly uncomfortable mimicking Hawking, but Hawking seemed to enjoy the impression.

Hawking is the third high-profile guest star to appear in season 5, after Mike Massimino and Leonard Nimoy. Hawking later appeared in the season 6 episode "The Extract Obliteration", the season 7 episode "The Relationship Diremption" and the season 8 episode "The Troll Manifestation", but in these episodes only his voice is heard. Hawking was shown in a pre-recorded video segment at the Big Bang Theory panel at Comic-Con 2013. He apologized for not being there in person and sang the show's theme tune.

Following "The Hawking Excitation", there was a three-week break before the next episode, "The Stag Convergence", aired.

== Reception ==
=== Ratings ===
On the night of its first broadcast on CBS on April 5, 2012, the episode was watched by 13.29 million U.S. households and received a Nielsen rating of 4.2/14 among viewers aged between 18 and 49 (meaning that 4.2% of 18–49 years olds watched the episode). It aired at 8 p.m. alongside American Idol on Fox, Missing on ABC, NBC's Community and a repeat episode of The Vampire Diaries on The CW. The episode was the third most watched program that night, and second most watched on CBS.

In Canada, the episode received 3.18 million viewers, making it the most watched episode that week. In the UK, the episode aired on May 17, 2012 and 1.83 million households watched it on E4. It garnered 0.34 million viewers on E4 +1, so was watched by 2.17 million viewers overall. On E4, it was the most watched show that week while on E4 +1, it ranked third. In Australia, the episode aired on April 24, 2013 and had 1.87 million viewers. It was the second most watched show on television that night.

=== Reviews ===
Overall, the episode received mixed reviews. Carla Day from TV Fanatic gave the episode a very positive review, describing it as "Possibly, the best episode. Ever." and giving it the maximum possible editor rating (5.0). Oliver Sava of The A.V. Club gave the episode a B−. Sava complimented Hawking's line, "it was quite a boner", calling it "the big pay-off of the story" and enjoyed the scene with Bernadette. However, Sava also said the "personal slave" storyline was a "classic sitcom plot" and noted that it was "the second episode in a row with no Amy".

R. L. Shaffer of IGN rated it 7.5 out of 10 and wrote that the episode "played like filler" but was "a very good filler episode". Shaffer described the final scene with Hawking as "fun" and "effective", although claimed some of the subplots "were only so-so". Robin Pierson of The TV Critic rated the episode 36 out of 100, stating that "the craft has gone from the stories and jokes in favour of the most basic stories and punch lines." Pierson thought Helberg "did a nice job showing vulnerability" as Howard, but that the episode overall was "one utterly predictable, unimaginative joke after another."

Simon Helberg complimented Stephen Hawking on his comedic timing via Twitter. The Huffington Post said that "none of [Hawking's guest appearances] felt quite as right as when he appeared as himself on "The Big Bang Theory"."
