= AdS black hole =

Black hole solution of general relativity

In theoretical physics, an anti-de Sitter (AdS) black hole is a black hole solution of general relativity or its extensions which represents an isolated massive object, but with a negative cosmological constant. Such a solution asymptotically approaches anti-de Sitter space at spatial infinity, and is a generalization of the Kerr vacuum solution, which asymptotically approaches Minkowski spacetime at spatial infinity.

In 3+1 dimensions, the metric is given by
$$ds^2 = - \left( k^2r^2 + 1 - \frac{C}{r} \right)dt^2 + \frac{1}{k^2r^2 + 1 - \frac{C}{r}}dr^2 + r^2 d\Omega^2$$
where t is the time coordinate, r is the radial coordinate, Ω are the polar coordinates, C is a constant and k is the AdS curvature.

In general, in d + 1 dimensions, the metric is given by
$$ds^2 = - \left( k^2r^2 + 1 - \frac{C}{r^{d-2}} \right)dt^2 + \frac{1}{k^2r^2 + 1 - \frac{C}{r^{d-2}}}dr^2 + r^2 d\Omega^2$$

According to the AdS/CFT correspondence, if gravity were quantized, an AdS black hole would be dual to a thermal state on the conformal boundary. In the context of say, AdS/QCD, this would correspond to the deconfinement phase of the quark–gluon plasma.

Late-infall observers into AdS black holes may experience chaotic oscillations of spacetime of BKL type near their central singularities.

== See also ==
- BTZ black hole
- Black brane
