= A Brief History of Time =

1988 book by Stephen Hawking

- First edition
- Author: Stephen Hawking
- Language: English
- Subject: Cosmology
- Publisher: Bantam Dell Publishing Group
- Publication date: April 1, 1988
- Publication place: United Kingdom
- Media type: Print (hardcover and paperback)
- Pages: 256
- ISBN: 978-0-553-10953-5
- OCLC: 39256652
- Dewey Decimal: 523.1 21
- LC Class: QB981 .H377 1998
- Followed by: Black Holes and Baby Universes and Other Essays

A Brief History of Time: From the Big Bang to Black Holes is a book on cosmology by the physicist Stephen Hawking, first published in 1988.

Hawking writes in non-technical terms about the structure, origin, development and eventual fate of the universe. He talks about basic concepts like space and time, building blocks that make up the universe (such as quarks) and the fundamental forces that govern it (such as gravity). He discusses two theories, general relativity and quantum mechanics that form the foundation of modern physics. Finally, he talks about the search for a unified theory that consistently describes everything in the universe.

The book became a bestseller and has sold more than 25 million copies in 40 languages. It was included on Time's list of the 100 best nonfiction books since the magazine's founding. Errol Morris made a documentary, A Brief History of Time (1991) which combines material from Hawking's book with interviews featuring Hawking, his colleagues, and his family.

An illustrated version was published in 1996. In 2006, Hawking and Leonard Mlodinow published an abridged version, A Briefer History of Time.

== Publication ==
In 1983, Hawking approached Simon Mitton, the editor in charge of astronomy books at Cambridge University Press, with his ideas for a popular book on cosmology. Mitton was doubtful about all the equations in the draft manuscript, which he felt would put off the buyers in airport bookshops that Hawking wished to reach. In the acknowledgements, Hawking says he was warned that for every equation in the book, the readership would be halved. So it includes only a single equation: $E = mc^2$.

== Contents ==
=== Chapter 1: Our Picture of the Universe ===
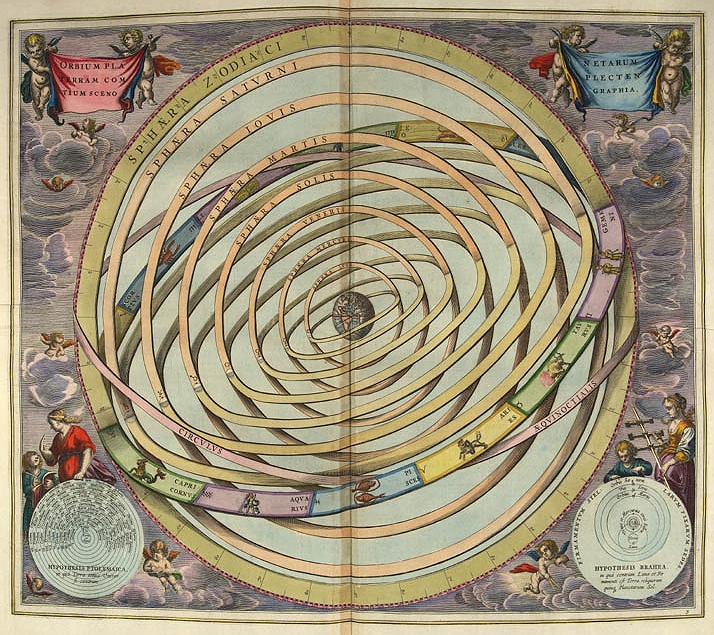
Ptolemy's Earth-centric model about the location of the planets, stars, and Sun

Hawking begins with an anecdote about a scientist lecturing on the universe. An old woman got up and said, "What you have told us is rubbish. The world is really a flat plate supported on the back of a giant tortoise." The scientist asked what the tortoise was standing on. She replied, "You're very clever young man, very clever. But it's turtles all the way down!" Hawking goes on to explain why we know better.

He discusses the history of astronomy, starting with Aristotle's conclusions about a spherical Earth and a circular geocentric model of the universe, later elaborated upon by the second-century Greek astronomer Ptolemy. He discusses the development of the heliocentric model of the Solar System by the Polish astronomer Nicholas Copernicus in 1514. A century later, the Italian Galileo Galilei turned a Dutch spyglass to the heavens. His observations of Jupiter's moons provided support for Copernicus. The German astronomer Johannes Kepler formulated his laws of planetary motion, in which planets move in ellipses. Kepler's laws were explained by English physicist Isaac Newton in his Principia Mathematica (1687).

Hawking discusses how the subject of the origin of the universe has been debated over time: the perennial existence of the universe hypothesized by Aristotle and other early philosophers was opposed by St. Augustine and other theologians' belief in its creation at a specific time in the past. Immanuel Kant argued that time had no beginning. In our time, the discovery of the expanding universe implied that between 10 billion and 20 billion years ago, the entire universe was contained in one singular extremely dense place, and that it doesn't make sense to ask what happened before. He writes: "An expanding universe does not preclude a creator, but it does place limits on when he might have carried out his job!"

=== Chapter 2: Space and Time ===
Hawking describes the evolution of scientific thought regarding the nature of space and time. He starts with the Aristotelian idea that the naturally preferred state of a body is to be at rest, and it can only be moved by force, implying that heavier objects will fall faster. However, Galileo experimentally disproved Aristotle's theory by observing the motion of objects of different weights and concluding that all objects would fall at the same rate. This led to Newton's laws of motion and gravity. However, Newton's laws implied that there is no such thing as absolute state of rest or absolute space: whether an object is 'at rest' or 'in motion' depends on the observer's inertial frame of reference.

Hawking describes the classical belief in absolute time, that observers in motion will measure the same time. However, Hawking writes that this commonsense notion does not work at or near the speed of light. That light travels at a finite speed was discovered by Ole Rømer through his observations of Jupiter and its moons. Scottish scientist James Clerk Maxwell's equations unifying electricity and magnetism predicted the existence of waves moving at a fixed speed, the same speed that had been measured for light. Physicists believed that light must travel through a luminiferous aether, and that the speed of light was relative to that of the aether. The Michelson–Morley experiment, designed to detect the speed of light through the aether, got a null result. Michelson and Morley found that the speed of light was constant regardless of the motion of the source or the observer. Combining this with a postulate that the laws of physics are the same for all observers moving relative to one another, Albert Einstein argued that the aether is superfluous if we abandon absolute time. His 1905 paper became known as the special theory of relativity.

Hawking discusses two remarkable consequences of this new theory. The first is the equivalence of mass and energy: they are related by the equation $E = mc^2$. This also means that no object with mass can reach the speed of light (c = 3×10^{8} m/s). The second consequence is a fundamental change in our ideas of 'space' and 'time'. Hawking points to the definition of the fundamental unit of length in terms of time as one example.

In 1915, Einstein published general relativity, which explains gravity as the curvature of spacetime. Matter and energy (including light) follow geodesics. Einstein's theory of gravity predicts a dynamic universe.

=== Chapter 3: The Expanding Universe ===
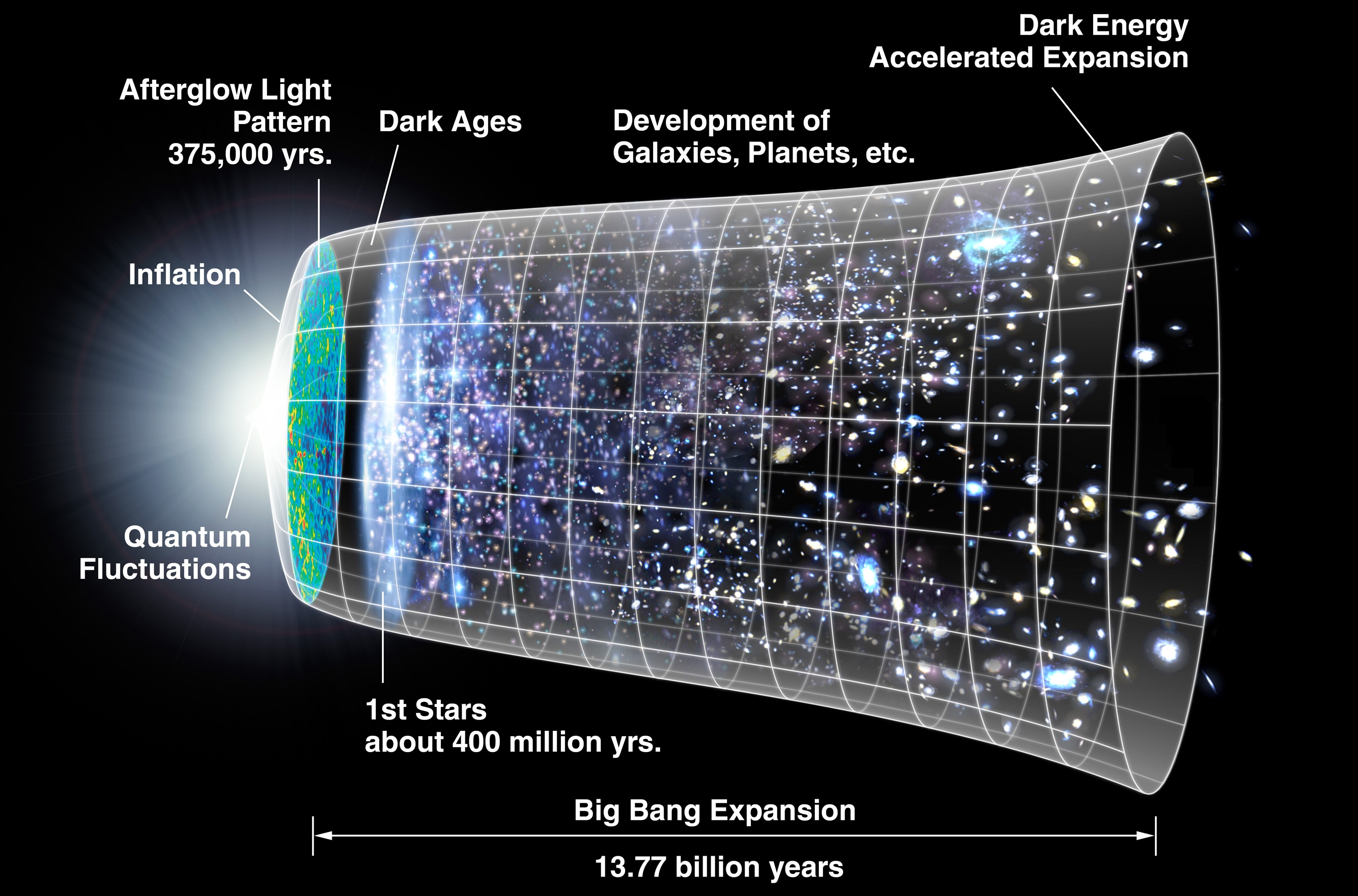
The expansion of the universe since the Big Bang

Hawking describes how physicists and astronomers calculated the relative distance of stars from the Earth. Sir William Herschel confirmed the positions and distances of many stars in the night sky. In 1924, Edwin Hubble discovered a method to measure the distance using the brightness of Cepheid variable stars as viewed from Earth. The luminosity and distance of these stars are related by a simple mathematical formula. Using this, he showed that ours is not the only galaxy.

In 1929, Hubble discovered that light from most galaxies was shifted to the red, and that the degree of redshift is directly proportional to distance. From this, he determined that the universe is expanding. This possibility had not been seriously considered. Einstein was so sure of a static universe that he added the cosmological constant to his equations. Many astronomers also tried to avoid the implications of general relativity, with one notable exception: the Russian physicist Alexander Friedmann.

In 1922, Friedmann made two very simple assumptions: the universe is identical wherever we are, (homogeneity), and that it is identical in every direction that we look, (isotropy). It follows that the universe is non-static. Support was found when two physicists at Bell Labs, Arno Penzias and Robert Wilson, found unexpected microwave radiation coming from all parts of the sky. At around the same time, Robert H. Dicke and Jim Peebles were also working on microwave radiation. They argued that radiation from the early universe should be detectable as the cosmic microwave background. This was what Penzias and Wilson had found.

In 1965, Roger Penrose used general relativity to prove that a collapsing star could result in a singularity. Hawking and Penrose proved together that the universe should have arisen from a singularity. Hawking later argued this need not be the case once quantum effects are taken into account.

=== Chapter 4: The Uncertainty Principle ===
Hawking begins by discussing nineteenth-century French mathematician Laplace's belief in scientific determinism, where scientific laws would be able to perfectly predict the future of the universe. A crack in classical physics appeared with the ultraviolet catastrophe: according to the calculations of British scientists Lord Rayleigh and James Jeans, a hot body should radiate an infinite amount of energy. In 1900, the ultraviolet catastrophe was averted by Max Planck, who proposed that energy must be absorbed or emitted in discrete packets called quanta.

Hawking discusses Werner Heisenberg's uncertainty principle, according to which the speed and the position of a particle cannot be precisely known due to Planck's quantum hypothesis: increasing the accuracy in measuring its speed will decrease the certainty of its position and vice versa. This overturned Laplace's idea of a completely deterministic theory of the universe. Hawking describes the development by Heisenberg, Erwin Schrödinger and Paul Dirac of quantum mechanics, a theory which introduced an irreducible element of unpredictability into science, and despite Einstein's strong objections, has proven to be very successful in describing the universe at small scales.

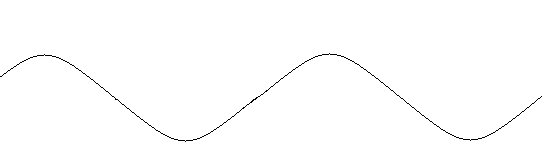
A representation of a light wave

Hawking discusses how Heisenberg's uncertainty principle implies the wave–particle duality of light (and particles in general).

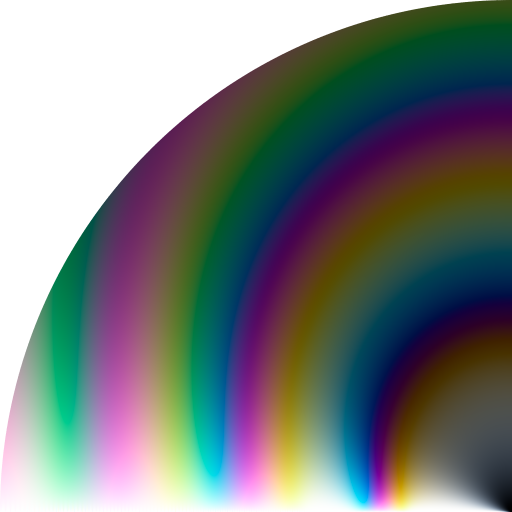
Light interference causes many colours to appear.

He describes the phenomenon of interference, where multiple light waves interfere with each other to give rise to a single light wave with properties different from those of the component waves, as well as the interference within particles, exemplified by the two-slit experiment. Hawking writes that American scientist Richard Feynman's sum over histories is a useful way of visualize quantum behavior. Hawking explains that Einstein's general theory of relativity is a classical, non-quantum theory as it ignores the uncertainty principle and that it has to be reconciled with quantum theory in situations where gravity is very strong, as in a singularity.

=== Chapter 5: Elementary Particles and Forces of Nature ===
Hawking traces the history of investigation into the nature of matter: Aristotle's four elements, Democritus's indivisible atoms, John Dalton's idea of atoms combining to form molecules, J. J. Thomson's discovery of the electron, Ernest Rutherford's discovery of the atomic nucleus, James Chadwick's discovery of the neutron and finally Murray Gell-Mann's theorizing of quarks which constitute protons and neutrons (collectively called hadrons). Hawking discusses the six different "flavors" (up, down, strange, charm, bottom, and top) and three different "colors" of quarks (red, green, and blue). Later he discusses anti-quarks, which are outnumbered by quarks due to the expansion and cooling of the universe.

A particle of spin 1 needs to be turned around all the way to look the same again, like this arrow.

Hawking introduces the spin of particles. Particles can be divided into two groups. Fermions, or matter particles, have a spin of 1/2. Fermions follow Wolfgang Pauli's exclusion principle: they cannot share the same quantum state (for example, two "spin up" protons cannot occupy the same location in space). Without this rule, atoms could not exist. Bosons, or the force-carrying particles, have a spin of 0, 1, or 2 and do not follow the exclusion principle.

A proton consists of three quarks, which are different colours due to colour confinement.

Gravity is thought to be carried by gravitons, massless particles with spin 2. The electromagnetic force is carried by photons. The weak nuclear force is responsible for radioactivity and is carried by W and Z bosons. The strong nuclear force, which binds quarks into hadrons and binds hadrons together into atomic nuclei, is carried by the gluon. Hawking writes that color confinement prevents the discovery of quarks and gluons on their own (except at extremely high temperature) as they remain confined within hadrons.

Hawking writes that at extremely high temperature, the electromagnetic force and weak nuclear force behave as a single electroweak force, giving rise to the speculation that at even higher temperatures, the electroweak force and strong nuclear force would also behave as a single force. Theories which attempt to describe the behaviour of this "combined" force are called Grand Unified Theories, which may help us explain many of the mysteries of physics.

=== Chapter 6: Black Holes ===
A black hole, showing how it distorts its background image through gravitational lensing

Hawking discusses black holes, regions of spacetime where extremely strong gravity prevents everything, including light, from escaping them. The term black hole was coined by John Archibald Wheeler in 1969, although the idea is older. The Cambridge clergyman John Michell imagined stars so massive that light could not escape their gravitational pull. Hawking explains stellar evolution: how main sequence stars shine by fusing hydrogen into helium, staving off gravitational collapse. A collapsed star may form a white dwarf, supported by electron degeneracy, or a neutron star, supported by the exclusion principle. Subrahmanyan Chandrasekhar found that for a collapsed star of more than 1.4 solar masses, there would be nothing to halt complete gravitational collapse. He was dissuaded from this thinking by Arthur Eddington, though it later won him the Nobel Prize in Physics. The critical mass is known as the Chandrasekhar limit.

He describes the event horizon, the black hole's boundary from which no particle can escape. He writes: "One could well say of the event horizon what the poet Dante said of the entrance to Hell: 'All hope abandon, ye who enter here.'" Hawking discusses non-rotating black holes with spherical symmetry and rotating ones with axisymmetry. The discovery of quasars by Maarten Schmidt in 1963 and pulsars by Jocelyn Bell-Burnell in 1967 gave hope that black holes might be detected. Even though black holes (by definition) do not emit light, astronomers can observe them through their interactions with visible matter. A star falling into a black hole would be a powerful source of X-rays. Cygnus X-1, a powerful source of X-rays, was the earliest plausible candidate for a black hole. Hawking concludes by mentioning his 1974 bet with American physicist Kip Thorne. Hawking argued that Cygnus X-1 does not contain a black hole. Hawking conceded the bet as evidence for black holes proved overwhelming.

=== Chapter 7: Black Holes Ain't So Black ===
Hawking discusses an aspect of black holes' behavior that he discovered in the 1970s. According to earlier theories, black holes can only become larger because nothing which enters a black hole can come out. This was similar to entropy, a measure of disorder which, per the second law of thermodynamics, always increases. Hawking and his student Jacob Bekenstein suggested that the area of a black hole's event horizon is a measure of its entropy.

But if a black hole has entropy, it must have a temperature, and must emit radiation. In 1974, Hawking published a new theory which argued that black holes can emit radiation. He imagined what might happen if a pair of virtual particles appeared near the edge of a black hole. Virtual particles briefly 'borrow' energy from the vacuum, then annihilate each other, returning the borrowed energy and ceasing to exist. However, at the edge of a black hole, one virtual particle might be trapped by the black hole while the other escapes. Thus, the particle takes energy from the black hole instead of from the vacuum, and escape from the black hole as Hawking radiation. According to Hawking, black holes must very slowly shrink over time and eventually "evaporate" because of this radiation.

=== Chapter 8: The Origin and Fate of the Universe ===
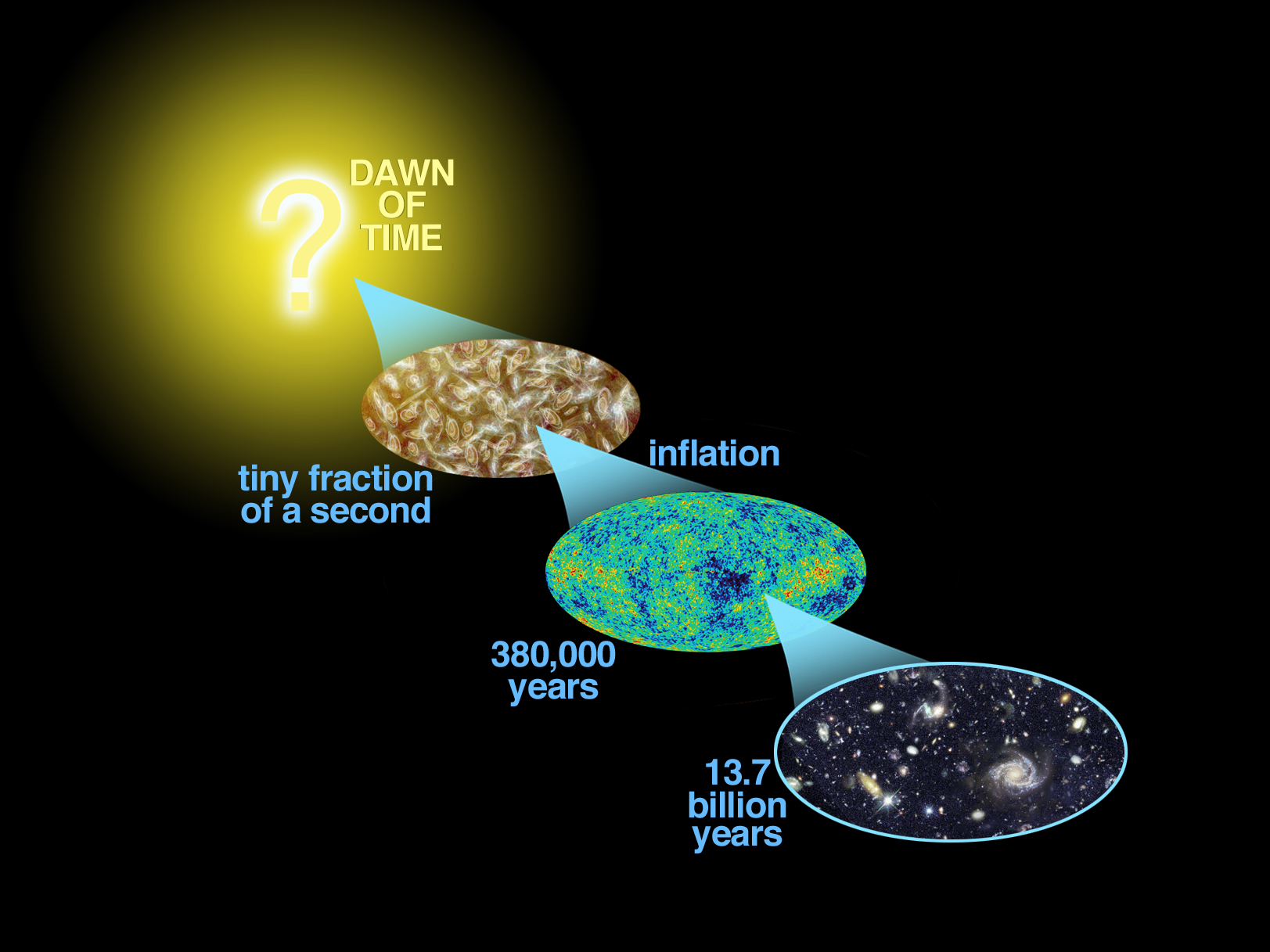
The Big Bang and the evolution of the universe

Hawking recalls a conference on cosmology at the Vatican, where he was given an audience with Pope John Paul II. The Pope said it was fine to study the early universe, but scientists should not study the Big Bang itself, as that was the moment of Creation and the work of God. Hawking writes: "I was glad then that he did not know the subject of the talk I had just given at the conference -- the possibility that space-time was finite but had no boundary, which means that it had no beginning, no moment of Creation. I had no desire to share the fate of Galileo, with whom I feel a strong sense of identity, partly because of the coincidence of having been born exactly 300 years after his death!"

At the Big Bang, the universe had an extremely high temperature, which prevented the formation of complex structures like stars, or even very simple ones like atoms. George Gamow predicted that radiation from the Big Bang should still fill the present universe. This was the cosmic microwave background discovered by Penzias and Wilson. The Big Bang created hydrogen and helium, and heavier elements were forged in stars.

The Big Bang model was supported by the redshift of galaxies, the cosmic microwave background and the relative abundance of hydrogen and helium. But mysteries remained: Why is the universe isotropic? Why is the cosmic microwave background so homogenous? Widely separated parts of the universe have the same temperature, but there would not have been time for these regions to have come into contact. Alan Guth's model of cosmic Inflation provided an answer to this horizon problem. Inflation explains other characteristics of the universe that had previously greatly confused researchers. After inflation, the universe continued to expand at a slower pace. It became much colder, eventually allowing for the formation of such stars.

Hawking discusses how the universe might have appeared if it had expanded slower or faster than it actually has. If the universe expanded too slowly, it would collapse, and there would not be enough time for life to form. If the universe expanded too quickly, it would have become almost empty. He discusses the anthropic principle, which states that the universe has laws of physics that allow for the evolution of life because, if it didn't, we wouldn't be here. Hawking suggests the no boundary proposal: that the universe is finite but has no beginning in imaginary time. It might merely exist.

=== Chapter 9: The Arrow of Time ===
Hawking discusses three "arrows of time". The first is the thermodynamic arrow of time: the direction in which entropy increases. This is given as the explanation for why we never see the broken pieces of a cup gather themselves together to form a whole cup. The second is the psychological arrow of time, whereby our subjective sense of time seems to flow in one direction, which is why we remember the past and not the future. The third is the cosmological arrow of time: the direction in which the universe is expanding rather than contracting. Hawking claims that the psychological arrow is intertwined with the thermodynamic arrow. According to Hawking, during a contraction phase of the universe, the thermodynamic and cosmological arrows of time would not agree.

Hawking then claims that the "no boundary proposal" for the universe implies that the universe will expand for some time before contracting back again. He goes on to argue that the no boundary proposal is what drives entropy and that it predicts the existence of a well-defined thermodynamic arrow of time if and only if the universe is expanding, as it implies that the universe must have started in a smooth and ordered state that must grow toward disorder as time advances. He argues that, because of the no boundary proposal, a contracting universe would not have a well-defined thermodynamic arrow and therefore only a universe that is in an expansion phase can support intelligent life. Using the weak anthropic principle, Hawking goes on to argue that the thermodynamic arrow must agree with the cosmological arrow in order for either to be observed by intelligent life. This, in Hawking's view, is why humans experience these three arrows of time going in the same direction.

=== Chapter 10: Wormholes and Time Travel ===
Hawking discusses whether time travel is possible. He shows how physicists have attempted to devise possible methods by humans with advanced technology may be able to travel faster than the speed of light, or travel backwards in time. Kurt Gödel presented Einstein with a solution to general relativity that allowed for time travel in a rotating universe. Einstein–Rosen bridges were proposed early in the history of the theory. These wormholes would appear identical to black holes from the outside, but matter which entered would be relocated to a different location in spacetime, potentially in a distant region of space, or even backwards in time. However, later research demonstrated that such a wormhole would not allow any material to pass through before turning back into a regular black hole. The only way that a wormhole could theoretically remain open, and thus allow faster-than-light travel or time travel, would require the existence of exotic matter with negative energy density, which violates the energy conditions of general relativity. As such, almost all physicists agree that faster-than-light travel and travel backwards in time are not possible.

=== Chapter 11: The Unification of Physics ===
The fundamental objects of string theory are open and closed strings.

Quantum mechanics and general relativity describe the universe with astounding accuracy within their own domains of applicability (atomic and cosmic scales, respectively). However, these two theories run into problems when combined. For example, the uncertainty principle is incompatible with Einstein's theory. This contradiction has led physicists to search for a theory of quantum gravity.

Hawking is cautiously optimistic that such a unified theory of the universe may be found soon, in spite of significant challenges. At the time the book was written, superstring theory had emerged as the most popular theory of quantum gravity, but this theory and related string theories were still incomplete and had not yielded testable predictions (this remains the case as of 2021). String theory proposes that particles behave like one-dimensional "strings", rather than as dimensionless particles. These strings "vibrate" in many dimensions. Superstring theory requires a total of 10 dimensions. The nature of the six "hyperspace" dimensions required by superstring theory are difficult if not impossible to study.

Hawking thus proposes three possibilities: 1) there exists a complete unified theory that we will eventually find; 2) the overlapping characteristics of different landscapes will allow us to gradually explain physics more accurately with time and 3) there is no ultimate theory. The third possibility has been sidestepped by acknowledging the limits set by the uncertainty principle. The second possibility describes what has been happening in physical sciences so far, with increasingly accurate partial theories.

Hawking believes that such refinement has a limit and that by studying the very early stages of the universe in a laboratory setting, a complete theory of Quantum Gravity will be found in the 21st century allowing physicists to solve many of the currently unsolved problems in physics.

=== Conclusion ===
Hawking summarises the efforts made by humans through their history to understand the universe and their place in it: starting from the belief in anthropomorphic spirits controlling nature, followed by the recognition of regular patterns in nature, and finally with the understanding of the inner workings of the universe. He recalls Laplace's suggestion that the universe's structure and evolution could eventually be precisely explained by a set of laws whose origin is left in God's domain. However, Hawking states that the uncertainty principle introduced by quantum theory has set limits on knowledge.

Hawking comments that historically, the study of cosmology has been primarily motivated by a search for philosophical and religious insights, for instance, to better understand the nature of God, or even whether God exists at all. However, for Hawking, most scientists today who work on these theories approach them with mathematical calculation and empirical observation, rather than asking such philosophical questions. In his mind, the increasingly technical nature of these theories has caused modern cosmology to become increasingly divorced from philosophy. Hawking nonetheless expresses hope that one day everybody would understand the true origin and nature of the universe. "That would be the ultimate triumph of human reason—for then we would know the mind of God".

== Editions ==
- 1988: The first edition included an introduction by Carl Sagan that tells the following story: Sagan was in London for a scientific conference in 1974, and between sessions he wandered into a different room, where a larger meeting was taking place. "I realized that I was watching an ancient ceremony: the investiture of new fellows into the Royal Society, one of the most ancient scholarly organizations on the planet. In the front row, a young man in a wheelchair was, very slowly, signing his name in a book that bore on its earliest pages the signature of Isaac Newton ... Stephen Hawking was a legend even then." In his introduction, Sagan goes on to add that Hawking is the "worthy successor" to Newton and Paul Dirac, both former Lucasian Professors of Mathematics.

The introduction was removed after the first edition, as it was copyrighted by Sagan, rather than by Hawking or the publisher, and the publisher did not have the right to reprint it in perpetuity. Hawking wrote his own introduction for later editions.

- 1994, A brief history of time – An interactive adventure. A CD-Rom with interactive video material created by S. W. Hawking, Jim Mervis, and Robit Hairman (available for Windows 95, Windows 98, Windows ME, and Windows XP).
- 1996, Illustrated, updated and expanded edition: This hardcover edition contained full-color illustrations and photographs to help further explain the text, as well as the addition of topics that were not included in the original book.
- 1998, Tenth-anniversary edition: It features the same text as the one published in 1996, but was also released in paperback and has only a few diagrams included. ISBN 0553109537
- 2005, A Briefer History of Time: a collaboration with Leonard Mlodinow of an abridged version of the original book. It was updated again to address new issues that had arisen due to further scientific development. ISBN 0-553-80436-7

== Adaptions ==
=== Film ===
In 1991, Errol Morris directed a documentary film about Hawking; although they share a title, the film is a biographical study of Hawking, and not a filmed version of the book.

=== Apps ===
"Stephen Hawking's Pocket Universe: A Brief History of Time Revisited" is based on the book. The app was developed by Preloaded for Transworld publishers, a division of the Penguin Random House group.

The app was produced in 2016. It was designed by Ben Courtney and produced by Jemma Harris and is available on iOS only.

=== Opera ===
The Metropolitan Opera commissioned an opera to premiere in the 2015–2016 season based on Hawking's book. It was to be composed by Osvaldo Golijov with a libretto by Alberto Manguel in a production by Robert Lepage. The planned opera was changed to be about a different subject and eventually canceled completely.

== Reception ==
A Brief History of Time was included on Time magazine's list of the 100 best nonfiction books since the magazine's founding. Jeffrey Kluger wrote:

The genius of Hawking was to understand that while people weren't losing much sleep over such matters as event horizons, space-time geodesics and stellar contraction, they were deeply, primally interested in such questions as "Why does the universe go to all the bother of existing?" as he elegantly put it. In that riddle lives the smaller but more anthropocentrically relevant one, Why do we exist? Hawking provided answers — with hard physics, gentle metaphor, and ideas so big they fill up space itself. And you know what? We got it — and we're smarter and better because of that.

== See also ==
- General relativity § Further reading
- Hawking Index – a mock mathematical measurement of how far people will read a book before giving up, named in reference to Hawking's book.
- List of textbooks in thermodynamics and statistical mechanics
- List of textbooks on classical mechanics and quantum mechanics
- Turtles all the way down – a jocular expression of the infinite regress problem in cosmology that appears in Hawking's book
- The Road to Reality (2004), a guide to physics by Roger Penrose
