= VSCF =

Articles on VSCF (variable-speed constant-frequency) include:

- Constant speed drive
- Tap converter
