= IDG (disambiguation) =

IDG, or International Data Group, is a former name of International Data Corporation, an American technology, media, research, event management, and venture capital organization.

IDG may also refer to:

== Organizations ==
- IDG Ventures, a family of venture funds originally funded by International Data Group
- Apple Industrial Design Group, part of Apple Inc.
- Indigo Books and Music, a Canadian retail bookstore chain
- Industrial Development Group, a South African mining company headed by Makaziwe Mandela
- International Deployment Group, a department of the Australian Federal Police

== Other ==
- Integrated Drive Generator, an aircraft electrical generation unit
- Indo-Germanic
- The IATA code for Ida Grove Municipal Airport, an airport in Iowa, United States
- Infinite derivative gravity, a theory of modified gravity
