= Timeless universe =

Philosophical view of the universe

The timeless universe is the philosophical and ontological view that time and associated ideas are human illusions caused by our ordering of observable phenomena. Unlike most variants of presentism and eternalism, the timeless universe entirely rejects the notion of the reality of any time, arguing that it is exclusively a human illusion, and since the universe can know no time, no dimension of time can be permitted in any theoretical explanation of parts of the observable universe. All purported measurements of time must hence according to this view be correlation measurements between movements, as stated by physicist Ernst Mach in 1883:

It is utterly beyond our power to measure the changes of things by time. Quite the contrary, time is an abstraction at which we arrive by means of the changes of things; made because we are not restricted to any one definite measure, all being interconnected.

In a timeless universe the cosmos in its broadest definition is eternal, without beginning or end, and all physical processes operate within a timeless framework. Since fundamental problems related to time, such as the Arrow of time and time travel, are still among the great unsolved problems of physics, discussions of timeless universes revolve around proposed solutions to these fundamental problems and paradoxes, and the related fundamental problems of philosophy and science.

== History ==
The first person in recorded history to contemplate a timeless universe was the Ancient Greek philosopher Antiphon, who in the 5th century B.C. held that time was a man-made measure, rather than a real thing or substance. The same opinion was held by another Ancient Greek philosopher in the 2nd century B.C., Kritolaos.

In the 2400 years since Antiphon, many different theories of possible timeless universes have been advanced, seeking to explain in whole or in part phenomena otherwise associated with or requiring the existence of time. Thinkers who have examined possible mechanisms responsible for such phenomena in a timeless universe include physicists such as Ernst Mach, Albert Einstein, Kurt Gödel and Carlo Rovelli, and timeless universes have been contemplated in works dedicated specifically to the subject by physicists such as John McTaggart, Julian Barbour and others.

Research indicates that concepts of time are not universally known to humanity since the advent of behavioral modernity, but were developed by some cultures at some unknown point along the trajectory of the development of early human society. Indigenous tribes have been studied in Amazonas and elsewhere that were found by researchers not to have any developed concept of time at all.

=== Ernst Mach and Albert Einstein ===
The fundamental 1883 statement above was outlined by Ernst Mach in his book "The Science of Mechanics" and with him the idea of a timeless universe first came to prominence as a serious scientific idea. The particular passage quoted was singled out by Albert Einstein in his 1916 obituary for Mach, in which Einstein also described the great influence the Machian corpus had exerted and continued to exert upon generations of physicists:

I believe that even those who consider themselves opponents of Mach are hardly aware of how much of Mach's way of thinking they imbibed, so to speak, with their mother's milk.

Einstein opens the obituary in the Physikalische Zeitschrift with a firm rejection of those of his contemporary colleagues who view the epistemological inquiries of Mach as being work of lesser importance, and then opens the obituary proper with the central question which according to him ought to passionately interest and concern any disciple of science, such as himself:

What objective can and will that science achieve to which I have devoted myself? To what extent are its general results "true"? What is essential and what is only dependent on the accidents of development?

Einstein then proceeds to the central and largest part of his obituary, stating the importance of Mach and his work as follows:

The importance of such minds, like Mach, certainly lies not only therein, that they satisfy certain philosophical requirements of the age, which by the average inveterate specialist might be characterized as unnecessary luxury. Concepts which have proven useful in the ordering of things, through ourselves easily rise to such authority, that we forget that their origin is earthly - and accept them as unalterable/absolute facts. They are then established as "Logical necessities", "givens a priori", et cetera. The path of scientific progress is oft made inaccessible for generations through such errors. Hence it is certainly no frivolous activity, when we exercise ourselves in the analysis of these long-established concepts; in the analysis and demonstration of the circumstances upon which their justification and utility depend, even as they have emerged from the realm of experience and observed phenomena. In such exercise their overly large authority is broken: If they are unable to properly legitimize themselves, they are eliminated; if their application to a corresponding object in reality was sloppy, they are corrected; and they are replaced by others if it proves possible to adopt some new system, the which we may for some reasons prefer.

Such analyses are mostly perceived by the expert scientific specialist as superfluous, stilted, at times even ridiculous. The situation changes however, when one of the casually employed terms is replaced by a sharper more accurate one, because the development of a particular science-branch commands it: Then energic protest and lamentations are voiced by those guilty of sloppy procedure with their own terms, fearing for their most holy possessions. In this howling the voices of other philosophers chime in who think themselves unable to do without yonder term, because they had so lined it up within their little treasure-trove of the "absolute", the "a priori", et cetera, that they had proclaimed it an irrevocable fundamental principle.

The reader already conjectured that I am here particularly alluding to certain concepts of space and time and mechanics, which have been subjected to a modification through the theory of relativity. No one can take it away from the epistemologists that they paved the way here; at least in my own case I know that I have been propelled immensely, directly and indirectly, especially by Hume and Mach. I ask the reader to take into his hand the work of Mach: "The Science of Mechanics", and to contemplate his observations contained in its second chapter under parts VI. and VII. ("Newton's views of time, space, and motion." and "Discussion of Newton's view of time.")

Here we find thoughts masterfully presented, which as of yet have not at all become the common property of physicists. These parts are also especially intriguing for the reason that they grow directly out of Newtonian passages, quoted verbatim. I provide here a selection of the choicest morsels:

Newton: "Absolute, true, and mathematical time, of itself, and by its own nature, flows uniformly on, without regard to anything external. It is also called duration. Relative, apparent, and common time, is some sensible and external measure of absolute time (duration), estimated by the motions of bodies, whether accurate or inequable, and is commonly employed in of true time; as an hour, a day, a month, a year..."
Mach: "... When we say a Thing A changes with time, we mean simply that the conditions that determine a Thing A depend on the conditions that determine another Thing B. The vibrations of a pendulum take place in time when its excursion depends on the position of the earth. Since, however, in the observation of the pendulum, we are not under the necessity of taking into account its dependence on the position of the earth, but may compare it with any other thing (the conditions of which of course also depend on the position of the earth), the illusory notion easily arises that all the things with which we compare it are unessential. (....) It is utterly beyond our power to measure the changes of things by time. Quite the contrary, time is an abstraction, at which we arrive by means of the changes of things; made because we are not restricted to any one definite measure, all being interconnected."

These quoted lines show that Mach had clearly recognized the weak sides of classical mechanics, and was not far removed from demanding a general theory of relativity, and this already half a century ago! It is not improbable that Mach should have himself discovered the theory of relativity, if the question of the constancy of the speed of light had pre-occupied the community of physicists when he still had a fresh and youthful mind.

Einstein thus hails Mach as one of the great scientists of the era, and within his obituary gives the above passage dealing with the non-existence of time as evidence for why Mach was such a great physicist.

=== Kurt Gödel and Albert Einstein ===
Though the influence of Mach upon Einstein here described by the latter was certainly the most pronounced in the first four decades of his life, it is true that the warmth of Einstein's admiration for Mach cooled considerably after 1921 due to the posthumous publication of a text penned by Mach shortly before the latter's death disavowing any support for the theory of relativity. It must have disappointed Einstein, since we can see from partially extant friendly correspondence between the two that Mach had initially responded positively to the theory of relativity, much to the delight of Einstein. Einstein would later come to view Mach's ideas upon a number of subjects with increasing skepticism, but he never ceased to mention how Mach's work had influenced him and continued to discuss Machian problems and concepts with his close friends and colleagues.

One of these friends was Kurt Gödel, who in his works contemplated and examined universes both with and without concepts of time, the natures of which continued to be the subject of long discussions between himself and Einstein. Although in 1949 Gödel postulated a theorem that stated: "In any universe described by the theory of relativity, time cannot exist", it is important to stress that Gödel was considering many different universes employing for their theoretical constitutions many different theoretical conceptions of time. It was his endeavour to reconcile the paradoxes of time and timelessness with relativity theory upon a sound epistemological footing. Hence when Gödel is popularly known for proposing "his" universe in which time-travel is a possibility, it is in reality a gross overreduction and oversimplification of his work.

== Calendars in timeless universes ==
In a universe where time does not exist, the measure of time is spoken of only as existing within the sphere of man-made society and its sciences. The regular motions of the sun, earth and moon are real, and the shadows they produce can hence be measured and artificially quantified into days, months and years, and subdivided using other movements for measurement into increasingly small subdivisions. This is done for convenience in human societies for purposes of measurement or comparative analysis in history or other sciences.

It is therefore still possible in a timeless universe to speak of a date in time, such as the Battle of Marathon in 490 B.C., as long as such time is clearly separated from physics, and confined to the sphere of man-made historical science and its conventions. That is, when we understand that the year is a measure for revolutions of a planet around the sun, and that our planet was measured by historians as having completed some 2510 revolutions since that event occurred, which we may read out from our catalogues that fix events to observations of physical revolutions. No real time is measured, rather observations of changes in seasons and nights and days are recorded by historians.
