= Anupama =

Anupama may refer to:

- Anupama (given name), an Indian female given name (including a list of persons with the name)
  - Anupama (singer), Indian singer in Tamil cinema
- Anupama (1955 film), Indian Bengali-language film directed by Agradoot
- Anupama (1966 film), Indian Hindi-language film directed by Hrishikesh Mukherjee
- Anupama (1981 film), Indian film directed by Renuka Sharma
- Anupamaa, a 2020 Indian television soap opera

== See also ==
- Anupam (disambiguation)
  - Anupam (given name), masculine form of the given name
  - Anupam (supercomputer), by Bhabha Atomic Research Centre in India
