= Anupam (given name) =

- Gender: Male
- Language: Hindi; Sanskrit

Origin
- Meaning: "incomparable", "excellent"
- Region of origin: India

Other names
- Related names: Anupama, Nirupam

Anupam (in Devanagari : अनुपम) is an Indian masculine given name, whose meaning in Sanskrit is "incomparable", "excellent".

== Notable people named Anupam ==
- Anupam Amod, Indian playback singer
- Anupam Chander (born 1967), American lawyer and academic
- Anupam Dutta, Indian music director and composer
- Anupam Garg, Indian-American physicist
- Anupam Gupta (born 1954), Indian lawyer
- Anupam Hayat, Bangladeshi film critic
- Anupam Hazra (born 1982), Indian educator and member of parliament
- Anupam Joshi, Professor and Cybersecurity expert
- Anupam Kher (born 1955), Indian actor
- Anupam Mazumdar, theoretical physicist
- Anupam Mishra (born 1948), Indian author and environmentalist
- Anupam Nath (born 1971), Indian photojournalist
- Anupam Roy (born 1982), Indian composer and singer
- Anupam Sanklecha (born 1982), Indian cricketer
- Anupam Saraph (born 1961), Indian scientist
- Anupam Sarkar (born 1985), Indian footballer
- Anupam Sharma, Australian film director and actor
- Anupam Shobhakar, musician and composer
- Anupam Shyam (1957–2021), Indian actor
- Anupam Sinha (born 1962), Indian comics writer
- Anupam Sud (born 1944), Indian artist
- Anupam Tripathi, Artist - Korean Cinema
