= Anupam =

Anupam may refer to:

- Anupam (given name), an Indian masculine given name
- Anupam (supercomputer), a series of supercomputers developed at the Bhabha Atomic Research Centre

== See also ==
- Anupama (disambiguation)
