= Shape dynamics =

Theory of gravity

In theoretical physics, shape dynamics is a theory of gravity that implements Mach's principle, developed with the specific goal to obviate the problem of time and thereby open a new path toward the resolution of incompatibilities between general relativity and quantum mechanics.

Shape dynamics is dynamically equivalent to the canonical formulation of general relativity, known as the Arnowitt–Deser–Misner (ADM) formalism. Shape dynamics is not formulated as an implementation of spacetime diffeomorphism invariance, but as an implementation of spatial relationalism based on spatial diffeomorphisms and spatial Weyl symmetry. An important consequence of shape dynamics is the absence of a problem of time in canonical quantum gravity. The replacement of the spacetime picture with a picture of evolving spatial conformal geometry opens the door for a number of new approaches to quantum gravity.

An important development in this theory was contributed in 2010 by Henrique Gomes, Sean Gryb and Tim Koslowski, building on an approach initiated by Julian Barbour.

== Background ==
Mach's principle has been an important inspiration for the construction of general relativity, but the physical interpretation of Einstein's formulation of general relativity still requires external clocks and rods and thus fails to be manifestly relational. Mach's principle would be fully implemented if the predictions of general relativity were independent of the choice of clocks and rods. Barbour and Bertotti conjectured that Jacobi's principle and a mechanism they called "best matching" were construction principles for a fully Machian theory.

Barbour implemented these principles in collaboration with Niall Ó Murchadha, Edward Anderson, Brendan Foster and Bryan Kelleher to derive the ADM formalism in constant mean curvature gauge. This did not implement Mach's principle, because the predictions of general relativity in constant mean curvature gauge depend on the choice of clocks and rods. Mach's principle was successfully implemented in 2010 by Henrique Gomes, Sean Gryb and Tim Koslowski who drew on the work of Barbour and his collaborators to describe gravity in a fully relational manner as the evolution of the conformal geometry of space.

== Relation with general relativity ==
Shape dynamics possesses the same dynamics as general relativity, but has different gauge orbits. The link between general relativity and shape dynamics can be established using the ADM formalism in the following way: Shape dynamics can be gauge fixed in such a way that its initial value problem and its equations of motion coincide with the initial value problem and equations of motion of the ADM formalism in constant mean extrinsic curvature gauge. This equivalence ensures that classical shape dynamics and classical general relativity are locally indistinguishable. However, there is the possibility for global differences.

== Problem of time in shape dynamics ==
The shape dynamics formulation of gravity possesses a physical Hamiltonian that generates evolution of spatial conformal geometry. This disentangles the problem of time in quantum gravity: The gauge problem (the choice of foliation in the spacetime description) is replaced by the problem of finding spatial conformal geometries, leaving an evolution that is comparable to a system with time dependent Hamiltonian. The problem of time is suggested to be completely solved by restricting oneself to "objective observables," which are those observables that do not depend on any external clock or rod.

== Arrow of time in shape dynamics ==
Recent work by Julian Barbour, Tim Koslowski and Flavio Mercati demonstrates that Shape Dynamics possesses a physical arrow of time given by the growth of complexity and the dynamical storage of locally accessible records of the past. This is a property of the dynamical law and does not require any special initial condition.
