= Frank Pasquale =

American legal scholar

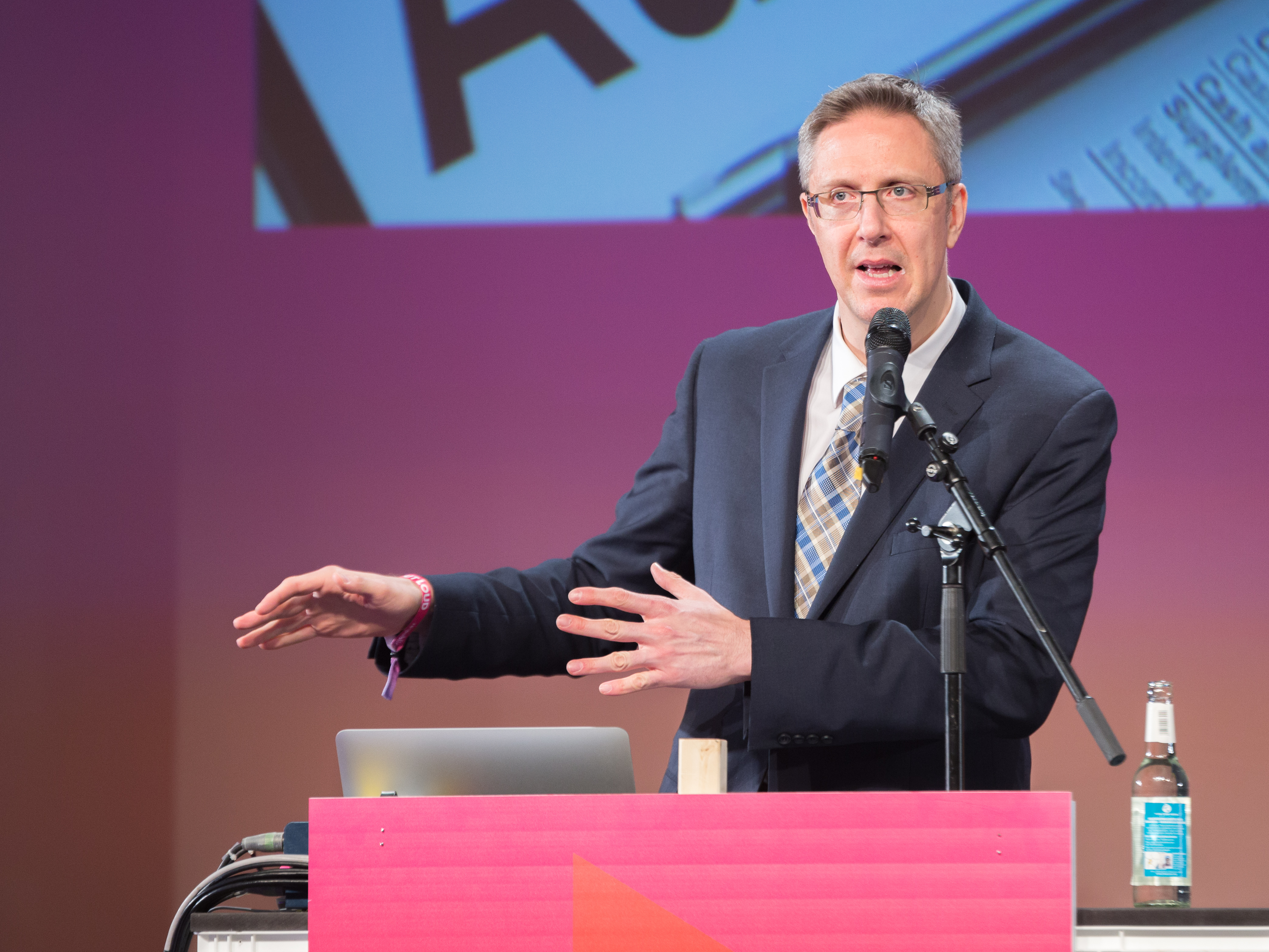
- Occupation: Legal scholar

Academic background
- Education: Harvard University; Oxford University; Yale Law School

Frank Pasquale is an American legal scholar with particular expertise on how artificial intelligence and machine learning processes relate to the law. He serves as Professor of Law at both Cornell Tech and Cornell Law School. An elected member of the American Law Institute, his most influential work is his 2015 book The Black Box Society: The Secret Algorithms That Control Money and Information.

== Education and career ==
Pasquale was raised in Phoenix, Arizona and attended Paradise Valley High School. In 1991, Pasquale won the Citizen Bee. Pasquale was educated at Harvard University, Oxford University, and Yale Law School, after which he served as a law clerk to Judge Kermit V. Lipez on the United States Court of Appeals for the First Circuit. Before joining the faculty at Cornell in 2023, he served as a chaired professor at the University of Maryland School of Law, Seton Hall University, and Brooklyn Law School.
