= ADM formalism =

Hamiltonian formulation of general relativity

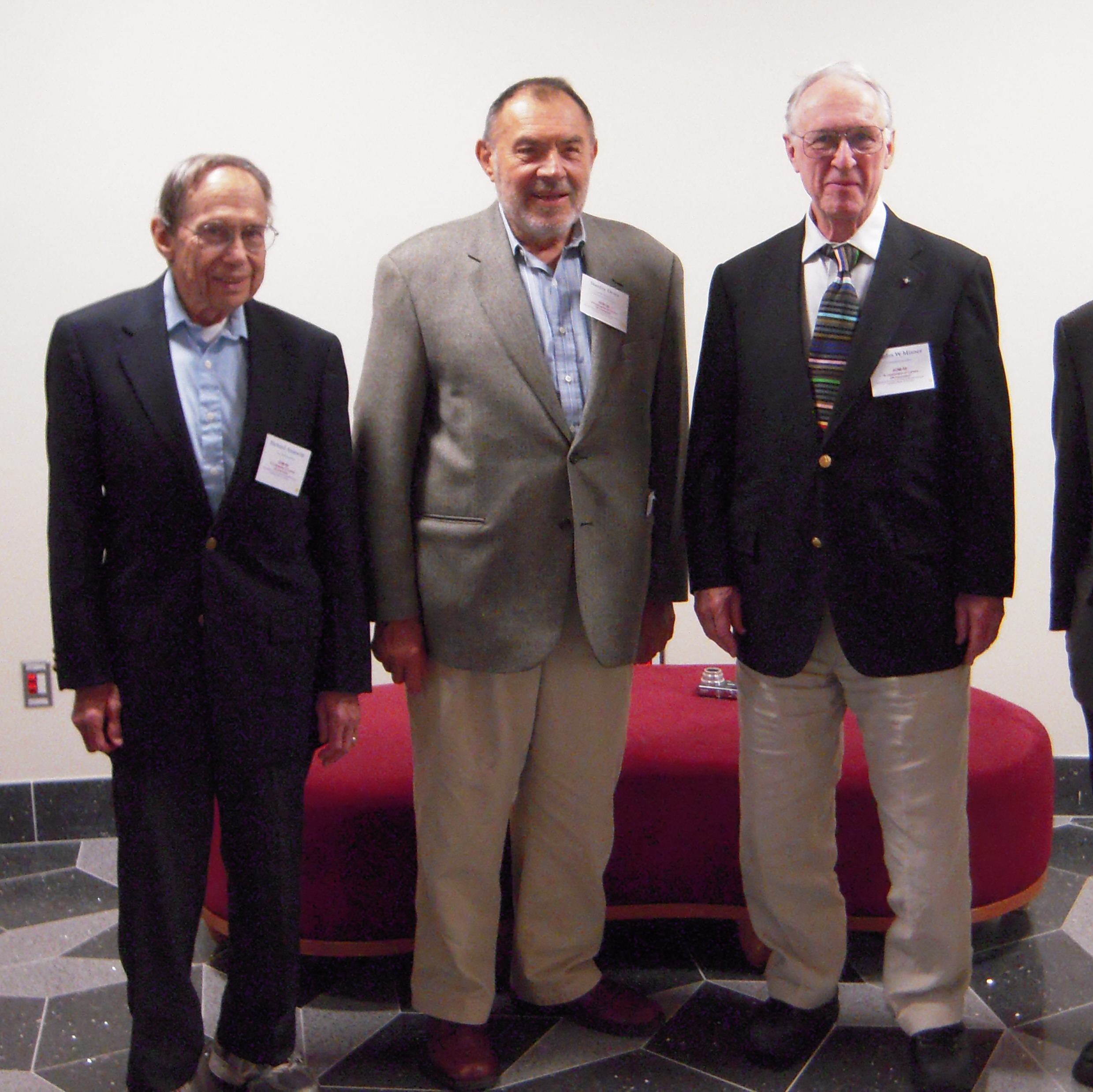
Richard Arnowitt, Stanley Deser and Charles Misner at the ADM-50: A Celebration of Current GR Innovation conference held in November 2009 to honor the 50th anniversary of their paper.

The Arnowitt–Deser–Misner (ADM) formalism (named for its authors Richard Arnowitt, Stanley Deser and Charles W. Misner) is a Hamiltonian formulation of general relativity that plays an important role in canonical quantum gravity and numerical relativity. It was first published in 1959.

The comprehensive review of the formalism that the authors published in 1962 has been reprinted in the journal General Relativity and Gravitation, while the original papers can be found in the archives of Physical Review.

== Overview ==
The formalism supposes that spacetime is foliated into a family of spacelike surfaces $\Sigma_t$, labeled by their time coordinate $t$, and with coordinates on each slice given by $x^i$. The dynamic variables of this theory are taken to be the metric tensor of three-dimensional spatial slices $\gamma_{ij}(t,x^k)$ and their conjugate momenta $\pi^{ij}(t,x^k)$. Using these variables it is possible to define a Hamiltonian, and thereby write the equations of motion for general relativity in the form of Hamilton's equations.

In addition to the twelve variables $\gamma_{ij}$ and $\pi^{ij}$, there are four Lagrange multipliers: the lapse function, $N$, and components of shift vector field, $N_i$. These describe how each of the "leaves" $\Sigma_t$ of the foliation of spacetime are welded together. The equations of motion for these variables can be freely specified; this freedom corresponds to the freedom to specify how to lay out the coordinate system in space and time.

== Notation ==
Most references adopt notation in which four dimensional tensors are written in abstract index notation, and that Greek indices are spacetime indices taking values (0, 1, 2, 3) and Latin indices are spatial indices taking values (1, 2, 3). In the derivation here, a superscript (4) is prepended to quantities that typically have both a three-dimensional and a four-dimensional version, such as the metric tensor for three-dimensional slices $g_{ij}$ and the metric tensor for the full four-dimensional spacetime ${^{(4)}}g_{\mu \nu}$.

The text here uses Einstein notation in which summation over repeated indices is assumed.

Two types of derivatives are used: Partial derivatives are denoted either by the operator $\partial_{i}$ or by subscripts preceded by a comma. Covariant derivatives are denoted either by the operator $\nabla_{i}$ or by subscripts preceded by a semicolon.

The absolute value of the determinant of the matrix of metric tensor coefficients is represented by $g$ (with no indices). Other tensor symbols written without indices represent the trace of the corresponding tensor such as $\pi = g^{ij}\pi_{ij}$.

== ADM Split ==
The ADM split denotes the separation of the spacetime metric into three spatial components and one temporal component (foliation). The basic idea is to express the spacetime metric in terms of a lapse function that represents the time evolution between hypersurfaces, and a shift vector that represents spatial coordinate changes between these hypersurfaces) along with a 3D spatial metric. Mathematically, this separation is written as:

$$ds^2 = -N^2 dt^2 + g_{ij} (dx^i + N^i dt)(dx^j + N^j dt)$$

where $N$ is the lapse function encoding the proper time evolution, $N_i$ is the shift vector, encoding how spatial coordinates change between hypersurfaces. $g_{ij}$ is the emergent 3D spatial metric on each hypersurface. This decomposition allows for a separation of the spacetime evolution equations into constraints (which relate the initial data on a spatial hypersurface) and evolution equations (which describe how the geometry of spacetime changes from one hypersurface to another).

== Derivation of ADM formalism ==
=== Lagrangian formulation ===
The starting point for the ADM formulation is the Lagrangian

$$\mathcal{L} = {^{(4)}R} \sqrt{-^{(4)}g},$$

which is a product of the square root of the determinant of the four-dimensional metric tensor for the full spacetime and its Ricci scalar. This is the Lagrangian from the Einstein–Hilbert action.

The desired outcome of the derivation is to define an embedding of three-dimensional spatial slices in the four-dimensional spacetime. The metric of the three-dimensional slices

$$g_{ij} = {^{(4)}}g_{ij}$$

will be the generalized coordinates for a Hamiltonian formulation. The conjugate momenta can then be computed as

$$\pi^{ij} = \sqrt{-^{(4)}g} \left( {^{(4)}}\Gamma^0_{pq} - g_{pq} {^{(4)}}\Gamma^0_{rs}g^{rs} \right) g^{ip}g^{jq},$$

using standard techniques and definitions. The symbols ${^{(4)}}\Gamma^0_{ij}$ are Christoffel symbols associated with the metric of the full four-dimensional spacetime. The lapse

$$N = \left( -{^{(4)}g^{00}} \right)^{-1/2}$$

and the shift vector

$$N_{i} = {^{(4)}g_{0i}}$$

are the remaining elements of the four-metric tensor.

Having identified the quantities for the formulation, the next step is to rewrite the Lagrangian in terms of these variables. The new expression for the Lagrangian

$$\mathcal{L} = -g_{ij} \partial_t \pi^{ij} - NH - N_i P^i - 2 \partial_i \left( \pi^{ij} N_j - \frac{1}{2} \pi N^i + \nabla^i N \sqrt{g} \right)$$

is conveniently written in terms of the two new quantities

$$H = -\sqrt{g} \left[^{(3)}R + g^{-1} \left(\frac{1}{2} \pi^2 - \pi^{ij} \pi_{ij} \right) \right]$$

and

$$P^i = -2 \pi^{ij}{}_{;j},$$

which are known as the Hamiltonian constraint and the momentum constraint respectively. The lapse and the shift appear in the Lagrangian as Lagrange multipliers.

=== Equations of motion ===
Although the variables in the Lagrangian represent the metric tensor on three-dimensional spaces embedded in the four-dimensional spacetime, it is possible and desirable to use the usual procedures from Lagrangian mechanics to derive "equations of motion" that describe the time evolution of both the metric $g_{ij}$ and its conjugate momentum $\pi^{ij}$. The result

$$\partial_t g_{ij} = \frac{2N}{\sqrt{g}} \left( \pi_{ij} - \tfrac{1}{2} \pi g_{ij} \right) + N_{i;j} + N_{j;i}$$

and

$$\begin{align}
\partial_t \pi^{ij} = &-N \sqrt{g} \left( R^{ij} - \tfrac{1}{2} R g^{ij} \right) + \frac{N}{2\sqrt{g}} g^{ij} \left( \pi^{mn} \pi_{mn} - \tfrac{1}{2} \pi^2 \right ) - \frac{2N}{\sqrt{g}} \left( \pi^{in} {\pi_n}^j - \tfrac{1}{2} \pi \pi^{ij} \right) \\
&+ \sqrt{g} \left (\nabla^i \nabla^j N - g^{ij} \nabla^n \nabla_n N \right ) + \nabla_n \left (\pi^{ij} N^n \right ) - {N^i}_{;n} \pi^{nj} - {N^j}_{;n} \pi^{ni}
\end{align}$$

is a non-linear set of partial differential equations.

Taking variations with respect to the lapse and shift provide constraint equations

$$H = 0$$

and

$$P^i = 0,$$

and the lapse and shift themselves can be freely specified, reflecting the fact that coordinate systems can be freely specified in both space and time.

== Applications ==
=== Application to quantum gravity ===
Using the ADM formulation, it is possible to attempt to construct a quantum theory of gravity in the same way that one constructs the Schrödinger equation corresponding to a given Hamiltonian in quantum mechanics. That is, replace the canonical momenta $\pi^{ij}(t, x^k)$ and the spatial metric functions by linear functional differential operators

$$\hat{g}_{ij}(t, x^k) \mapsto g_{ij}(t, x^k),$$
$$\hat{\pi}^{ij}(t, x^k) \mapsto -i \frac{\delta}{\delta g_{ij}(t, x^k)}.$$

More precisely, the replacing of classical variables by operators is restricted by commutation relations. The hats represent operators in quantum theory. This leads to the Wheeler–DeWitt equation.

=== Application to numerical solutions of the Einstein equations ===
There are relatively few known exact solutions to the Einstein field equations. In order to find other solutions, there is an active field of study known as numerical relativity in which supercomputers are used to find approximate solutions to the equations. In order to construct such solutions numerically, most researchers start with a formulation of the Einstein equations closely related to the ADM formulation. The most common approaches start with an initial value problem based on the ADM formalism.

In Hamiltonian formulations, the basic point is replacement of set of second order equations by another first order set of equations. We may get this second set of equations by Hamiltonian formulation in an easy way. Of course this is very useful for numerical physics, because reducing the order of differential equations is often convenient if we want to prepare equations for a computer.

== ADM energy and mass ==
ADM energy is a special way to define the energy in general relativity, which is only applicable to some special geometries of spacetime that asymptotically approach a well-defined metric tensor at infinity – for example a spacetime that asymptotically approaches Minkowski space. The ADM energy in these cases is defined as a function of the deviation of the metric tensor from its prescribed asymptotic form. In other words, the ADM energy is computed as the strength of the gravitational field at infinity.

If the required asymptotic form is time-independent (such as the Minkowski space itself), then it respects the time-translational symmetry. Noether's theorem then implies that the ADM energy is conserved. According to general relativity, the conservation law for the total energy does not hold in more general, time-dependent backgrounds – for example, it is completely violated in physical cosmology. Cosmic inflation in particular is able to produce energy (and mass) from "nothing" because the vacuum energy density is roughly constant, but the volume of the Universe grows exponentially.

== Application to modified gravity ==
By using the ADM decomposition and introducing extra auxiliary fields, in 2009 Deruelle et al. found a method to find the Gibbons–Hawking–York boundary term for modified gravity theories "whose Lagrangian is an arbitrary function of the Riemann tensor".

== See also ==
- Canonical coordinates
- Hamilton–Jacobi–Einstein equation
- Peres metric
- Shape dynamics
- Calculus of moving surfaces
