= Accessory drive =

Gas turbine gearbox

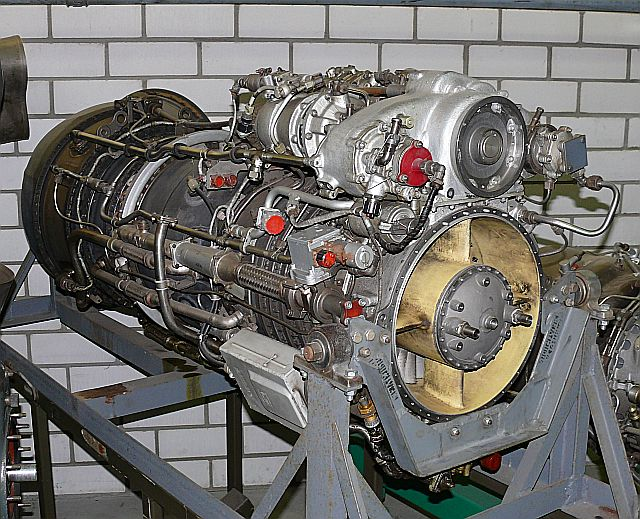
Klimov TV3-117 turboshaft engine. The accessory drive is the large casting on the top.

The accessory drive is a gearbox that forms part of a gas turbine engine. Although not part of the engine's core, it drives the accessories – such as generators, pumps for fuel and lubrication oil, air compressors, hydraulic pumps and engine starters – that are otherwise essential for the operation of the engine or the aircraft on which it is mounted. Accessory drives on large engines handle between 400–500 hp.

== Components ==
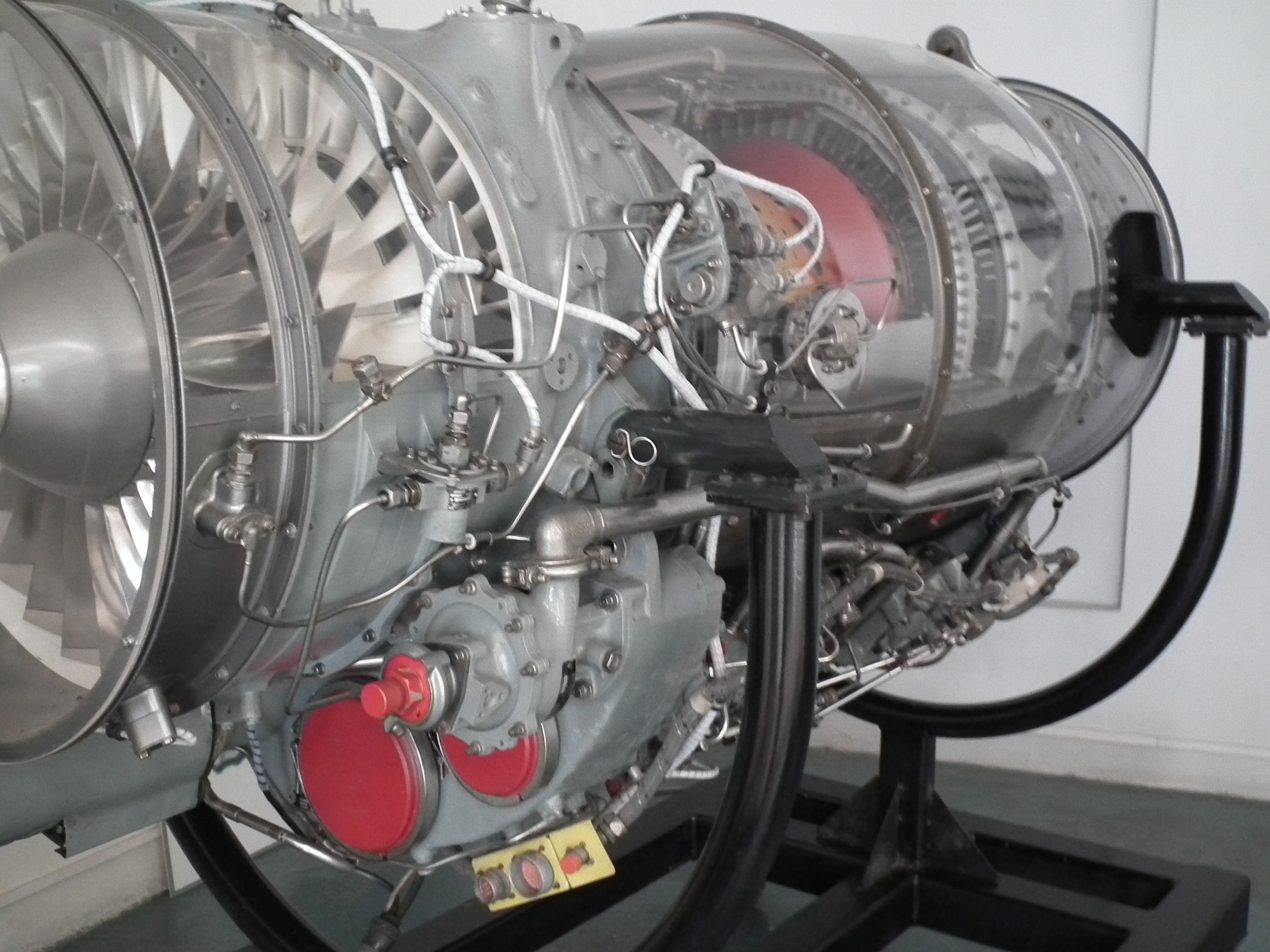
Turbomeca Adour, with the accessory drive mounted beneath. The accessories are removed and their mounting flanges covered by bright red blanking plugs.

Power for the accessory drive is taken from the central shaft linking the turbine and compressor sections of the engine. This requires an internal gearbox that couples the drive to a radial driveshaft or towershaft that drives an external gearbox.

=== Internal gearbox ===
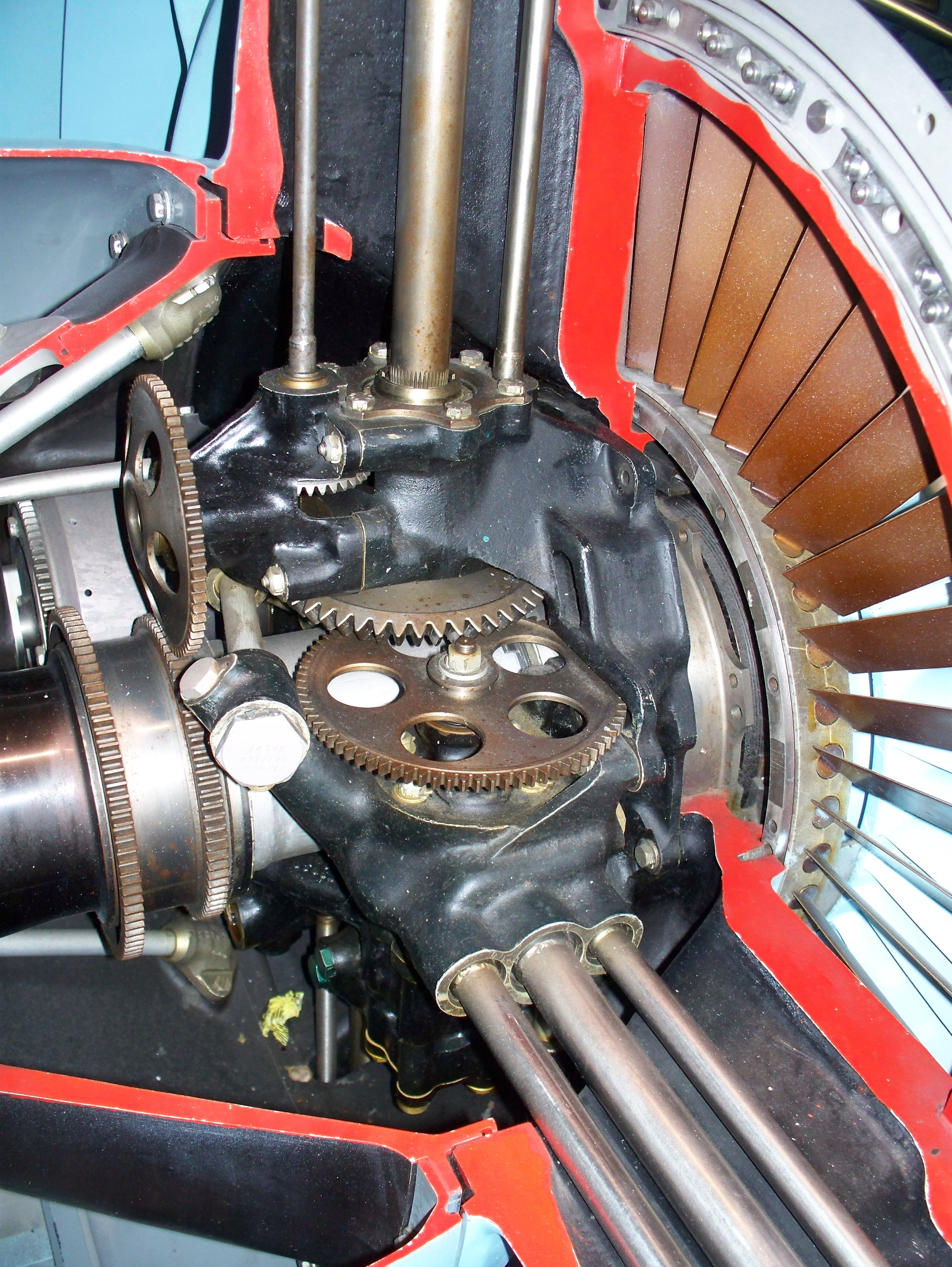
Internal gearbox of the Rolls-Royce Pegasus

The design of the internal gearbox is complicated by the heat and small space available in which to connect the driveshaft. It is usually placed between the compressor outlet and the combustor. In turboprops or designs with centrifugal compressors, it may be placed ahead of the compressor.

For two-shaft designs, an accessory drive will be taken from the high-pressure shaft, i.e. the outer and shorter of the two concentric shafts. This shaft comes up to speed more quickly when the engine is started. The drive and accessory gearboxes may also be split in two, one driven from each engine shaft, so as to distribute their loads. The engine-critical systems, including the starter drive, are arranged on the high-pressure shaft, with aircraft systems on the low-pressure shaft. The high-pressure shaft also rotates faster than the low-pressure shaft, which may influence the distribution of accessories.

To allow for thermal expansion, the drive from the main shaft may be taken by one of three means:

- Direct drive, by a bevel gear on the main shaft.
- Stub shaft drive, where a tubular stub shaft is fitted over the main shaft and driven from it by splines. This stub shaft carries the bevel gear that drives the radial shaft.
- Idler shaft drive, a narrow shaft runs parallel to the main shaft. It is driven by spur gears and in turn drives the bevel gear to the main gearbox.

=== Radial driveshaft ===
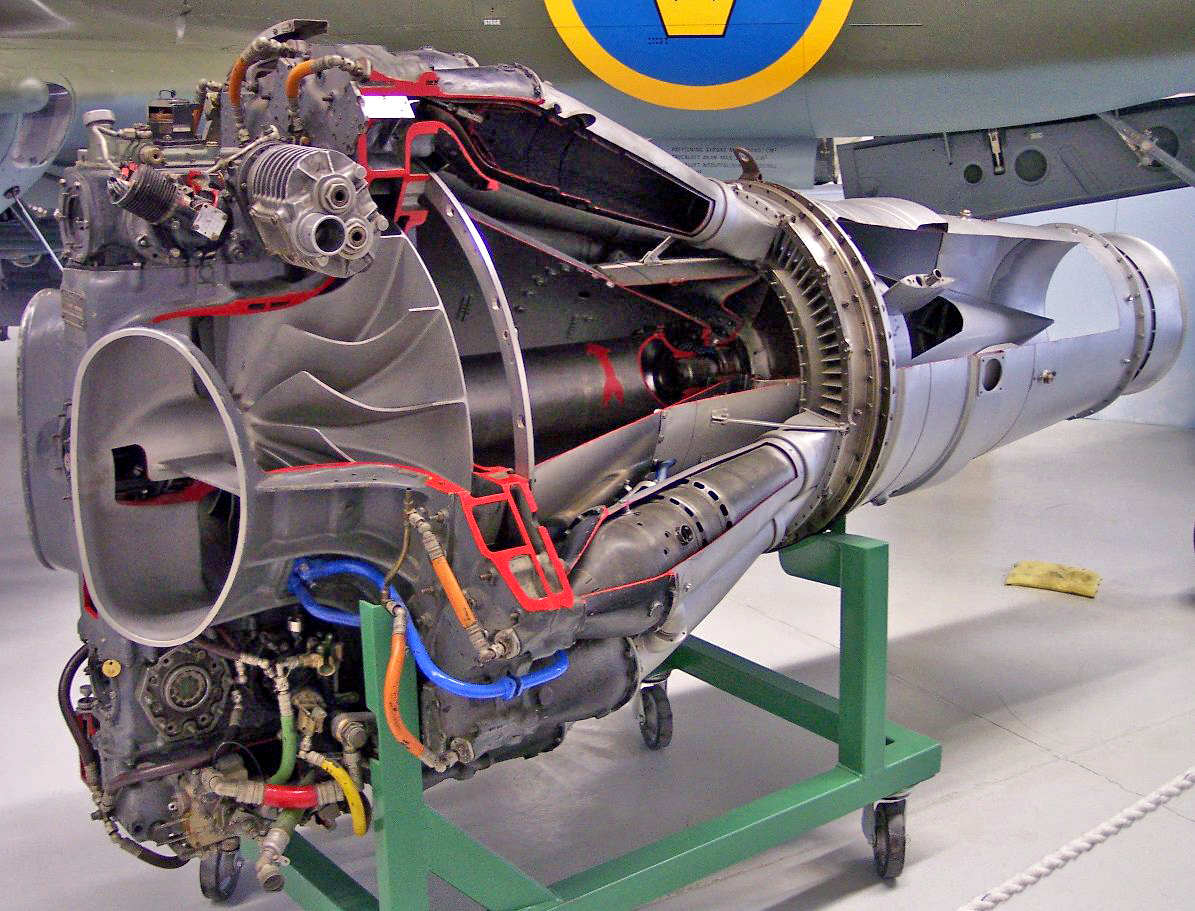
de Havilland Goblin Separate accessory drives are taken from the nose cone, above and below the engine core.

To make the best use of the limited space for the driveshaft and internal gearbox, the driveshaft runs at high speed, thus allowing it to be of small diameter. This reduces the disruption to the airflow and the size of the hollow fairing that encloses it.

If it is not possible to arrange a single straight path for the driveshaft, it may be arranged in two sections and linked by an intermediate gearbox. This is most commonly required for high-bypass turbofans with large diameter fans.

=== External gearbox ===
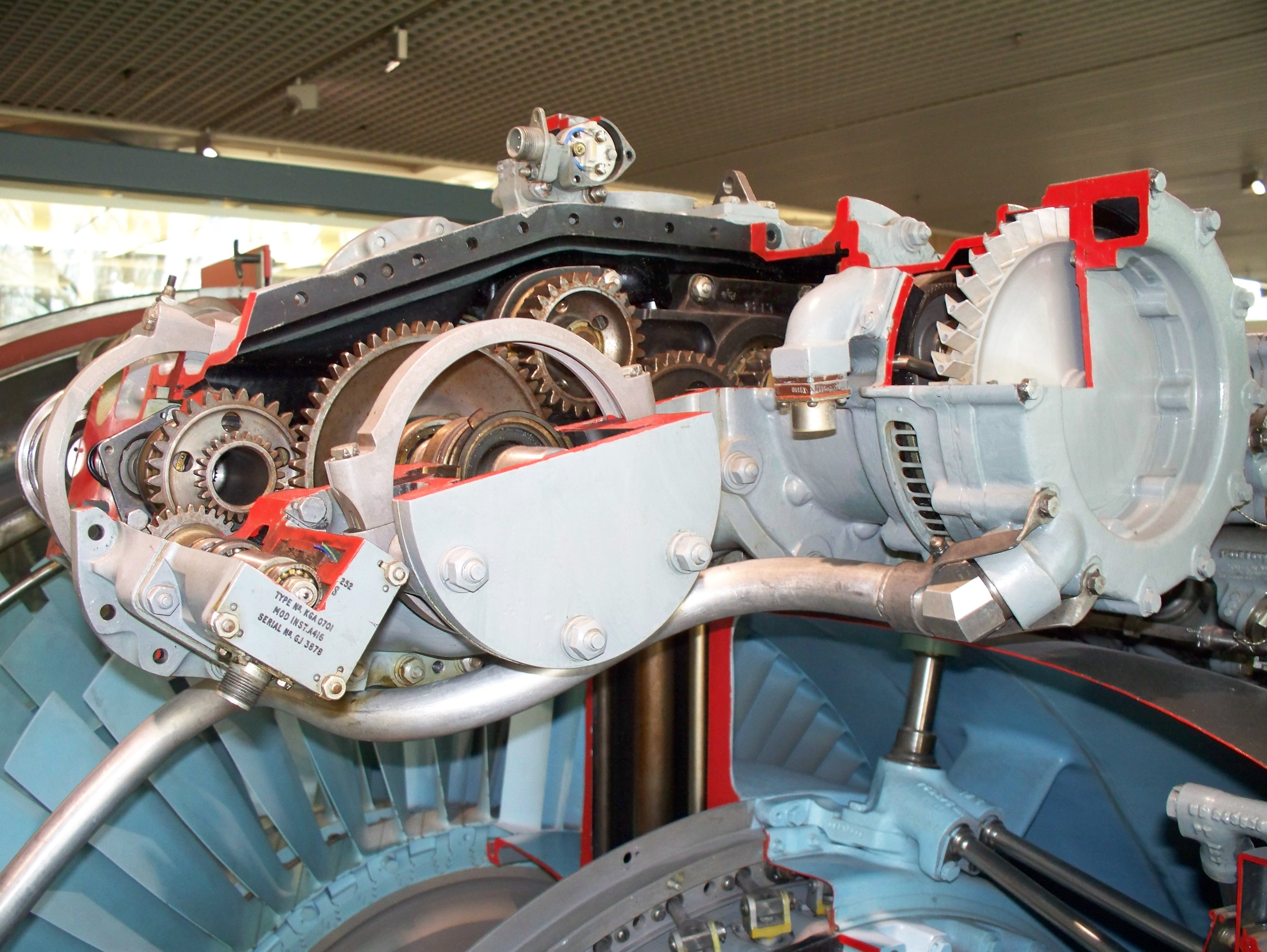
Sectioned accessory drive on top of a Rolls-Royce Pegasus

The packaging of an engine within its nacelle is a complicated task. The accessory drive is usually arranged as a curved casing, so that the various accessories are mounted close to the engine. The casing is a pair of light alloy castings. Separate machined mounting pads are provided for each accessory.

The drive within the casing is provided by a train of spur gears. Accessories are arranged on both sides of the driveshaft entry, in reducing order of their speed. The gears are usually plain spur gears, running in roller bearings. Idler gears are commonly used between them, to increase the spacing between accessories. Helical gears are sometimes used for the high-torque drives, typically the starter, as these give smoother running. However helical gears also generate an end-thrust, which then requires a more complicated thrust bearing to support them.

The complexity of an accessory drive and its gears is so great that they were used as a theme by the anthropomorphic illustrator Boris Artzybasheff in advertising for the Avco Lycoming company, who were making drive gearboxes for the Westinghouse J40 engine.

== Bleed air ==
In some engines, bleed air is also tapped to provide power for accessories, as well as a mechanical shaft drive. Bleed air is particularly useful when a source of compressed air is specifically needed, either to pressurise cabin air, or as a supply of cooling air to other components (to avoid excess heat, this is taken for a low-pressure tapping, or from the LP compressor of a two-shaft engine). One important use for bleed air is for cross-starting of other engines in a multi-engine aircraft.

== Accessories ==
Some of the accessories that may be driven include:

- Fuel pump

There may be a number of fuel pumps: low pressure, high pressure, afterburner pump and also a speed-sensitive governor

- Generators, often one for engine systems and one for the aircraft
- Constant Speed Drive to maintain a constant frequency AC generator
- Lubricating oil pumps
- Hydraulic pump
- High-pressure air compressor (undercarriage actuation, etc.)
- Low-pressure air compressor (cabin air conditioning), where this is not provided by tapping engine compressor bleed air.
- Engine starter
- Tachometer sensor drives
- Auxiliary gearbox drive, to a further gearbox that may be required in some installations.

Additional facilities are provided for a centrifugal oil breather, to separate the drive lubricating oil from the overboard breather air vent. Also access for hand-turning the engine, during ground maintenance.

== See also ==
- Components of jet engines
- Fuel control unit
- Nose bullet
