= James W. York =

American physicist (1939–2023)

James W. York Jr. (July 3, 1939 – December 17, 2023) was an American mathematical physicist who contributed to the theory of general relativity. In any physical theory, it is important to understand when solutions to the fundamental field equation exist, and answering this question was a theme of York's scientific work, with Yvonne Choquet-Bruhat, of formulating the Einstein field equation as a well-posed system in the sense of the theory of partial differential equations.

York earned his B.Sc. in 1962 and his Ph.D. in 1966 from North Carolina State University.

York used conformal geometry in the initial value problem, and introduced concepts now called the York curvature and York time.

York was a recipient of the Dannie Heineman Prize for Mathematical Physics from the American Physical Society, where he was a Fellow.

York died on December 17, 2023, at the age of 84.

== See also ==
- Gibbons–Hawking–York boundary term
