= The End of Time (book) =

Book by Julian Barbour

- Author: Julian Barbour
- Language: English
- Genre: Non-fiction
- Publisher: Oxford University Press
- Publication date: 1999
- Publication place: United Kingdom
- ISBN: 0-297-81985-2

The End of Time: The Next Revolution in Our Understanding of the Universe, also sold with the alternate subtitle The Next Revolution in Physics, is a 1999 popular science book in which the author Julian Barbour argues that time exists merely as an illusion.

== Autobiography ==
The book begins by describing how Barbour's view of time evolved. After taking physics in graduate school, Barbour went to Cologne for Ph.D. work on Einstein's theory of gravity. However he became preoccupied with the idea proposed by Ernst Mach that time is nothing but change. A remark by Paul Dirac prompted him to reconsider some mainstream physical assumptions. He worked as a translator of Russian scientific articles and remained outside of academic institutions which provided him time to pursue his research as he desired.

For some twenty years Barbour sought to reformulate physics in the spirit of Mach but found that his results had been already discovered in a different form called ADM formalism. He nearly gave up research, became involved in politics (p. 238) and began writing books on the history of physics. His interest, however, was rekindled after talking with Lee Smolin and reflecting on quantum mechanics. Barbour came to the conclusion that "If the Machian approach to classical dynamics is correct, quantum cosmology will have no dynamics. It will be timeless. It must also be frameless" (p. 232). He develops this view in the book.

He acknowledges also that John Bell presented in 1980 a "quantum mechanics for cosmologists" which comes in close agreement with his conclusions, except on the point about the reality of time (p. 301).

== Possibility ==
Barbour recounts that he read a newspaper article about Dirac's work in which he was quoted as saying: "This result has led me to doubt how fundamental the four-dimensional requirement in physics is". The nature of time as a fourth dimension or something else became the topic of research.

Cognisant of the counter-intuitive nature of his fundamental claim, Barbour eases the reader into the topic by first endeavouring to persuade the reader that our experiences are, at the very least, consistent with a timeless universe, leaving aside the question as to why one would hold such a view.

Barbour points out that some sciences have long done away with the "I" as a persisting identity. To take atomic theory seriously is to deny that the cat that jumps is the cat that lands, to use an illustration of Barbour's. The seething nebula of molecules of which we, cats, and all matter are made is ceaselessly rearranging at incomprehensibly fast speeds. The microcosm metamorphoses constantly, therefore one must deny there is any sense to say a cat or a person persists through time.

Early on, Barbour addresses the charge that writing with tensed verbs disproves his proposal. The next revolution in physics will undermine speaking in terms of time, he says, but there is no alternative.

If a universe is composed of timeless instants in the sense of configurations of matter that do not endure, one could nonetheless have the impression that time flows, Barbour asserts. The stream of consciousness and the sensation of the present, lasting about a second, is all in our heads, literally. In our brains is information about the recent past, but not as a result of a causal chain leading back to earlier instants. Rather, it is a property of thinking things, perhaps a necessary one to become thinking in the first place, that this information is present. In Barbour's words, brains are "time-capsules".

In order to explain away the widely shared stance about past events, Barbour analyses in detail how (historical) 'records' are created. His prime example are traces in a cloud chamber to which he devotes the penultimate chapter of the book. Except for the inexistence of time, he admits that John Bell had already solved most difficulties.

He investigates configuration spaces and best-matching mathematics, fleshing out how fundamental physics might deal with different instants in a timeless scheme. He calls his universe without time and only relative positions "Platonia" after Plato's world of eternal forms.

== Plausibility ==
Why, then, is the instant in configuration space, not matter in space-time, the true object and frame of the universe? He marshals as evidence a non-standard analysis of relativity, many-worlds theory and the ADM formalism. Since, he believes, we should be open to physics without time, we must evaluate anew physical laws, such as the Wheeler–DeWitt equation, that take on radical but powerful and fruitful forms when time is left out. Barbour writes that our notion of time, and our insistence on it in physical theory, has held science back, and that a scientific revolution awaits. Barbour suspects that the wave function is somehow constrained by the "terrain" of Platonia.

Barbour ends with a short meditation on some of the consequences of "the end of time". If there is no arrow of time, there is no becoming, but only being. "Creation" becomes something that is equally inherent in every instant.

== Criticism and reviews ==
Julian Barbour's research has been published in academic journals and monographs, whereas The End of Time was aimed at a more general and philosophically minded public. A number of professional philosophers have responded to the book.

Developing ideas from his book, in 2009 Barbour wrote an essay On the Nature of Time which was awarded first prize in the contest organized by FQXi.

== Editions ==
- The End of Time: The Next Revolution in Physics, Oxford University Press, 1999, ISBN 0-297-81985-2
- ———, OUP USA, 2000, ISBN 0-19-511729-8
- The End of Time: The next revolution in our understanding of the universe, Weidenfeld & Nicolson, 1999, ISBN 0-297-81985-2
- ———, Phoenix paperback, 2000, ISBN 0-7538-1020-4

== Reviews ==
- Simon W. Saunders, "Clock Watcher", The New York Times, March 26, 2000
- Butterfield, Jeremy (2002). The British Journal for the Philosophy of Science. 53 (2): 289–330. arXiv:gr-qc/0103055. doi:10.1093/bjps/53.2.289.
