= Nirupam =

- Gender: Male
- Language: Assamese, Bengali, Hindi

Origin
- Language: Indo-Aryan language
- Origin: India
- Meaning: "Without comparison"
- Region of origin: India

Other names
- Related names: Nirupama (feminine version), Anupam (same meaning)

Nirupam is an Indian masculine given name. The name generally means "without comparison", "incomparable", or "unique", and is of Indian origin. People with the name Nirupam are usually Hindu by religion.

== Notable people ==
- Nirupam Bajpai, Indian economist
- Nirupam Sen (diplomat), Indian diplomat
- Nirupam Sen (cricketer), Indian cricketer
- Nirupam Sen (politician), Indian politician
- Nirupam Sen Chowdhary, Indian cricketer
- Sanjay Nirupam, Indian politician
