= Tap converter =

AC power converter using transformer tap switching

- Component type: AC-to-AC power converter
- Inventor: Melvin Sandler (1981); Mariusz Wrzesniewski, Bruce David Wilner, Eddie Fung (enhancements, 1982–1984)
- Invention year: 1981

The tap converter is a variation on the cycloconverter, invented in 1981 by New York City electrical engineer Melvin Sandler and significantly functionally enhanced in 1982 through 1984 by graduate students Mariusz Wrzesniewski, Bruce David Wilner, and Eddie Fung. Whereas the cycloconverter switches among a variety of staggered input phases to piece together an extremely jagged output signal, the tap converter synthesizes a much smoother signal by switching among a variety of (obviously synchronized) transformer output taps.

== Tap positions ==
Both linear spacing and power-of-two-style Vernier spacing can be employed in establishing the tap positions, e.g., a four-tap transformer can provide taps at 0.25, 0.5, 0.75, 1.0 (linear) or 0.0625, 0.125, 0.25, and 0.5 (Vernier). (The limitations of the Vernier—in this case, that the maximum obtainable amplitude is 0.9375—are less discernible as more taps are added.)

== Scott transformer ==
By employing a Scott transformer input connection, in order to provide a quadrature phase, an even smoother output waveform can be obtained.

== Prototypes ==
Prototypes of the device were constructed and field-tested under a variety of conditions—nominally as a variable-speed constant-frequency (VSCF) power source for military aircraft—and ornate computer models were constructed for exploring more ornery considerations, such as flux leakage, hysteresis, and practical thyristor characteristics. All of this work was performed at New York's Cooper Union for the Advancement of Science and Art.

== Applications ==
As of 2007, the tap converter remains uncommercialized but is used in several military applications due to the minimal output harmonics.

== See also ==
- Constant speed drive
- Electric motor
- Variable-frequency drive
