= Julian Barbour =

British physicist (born 1937)

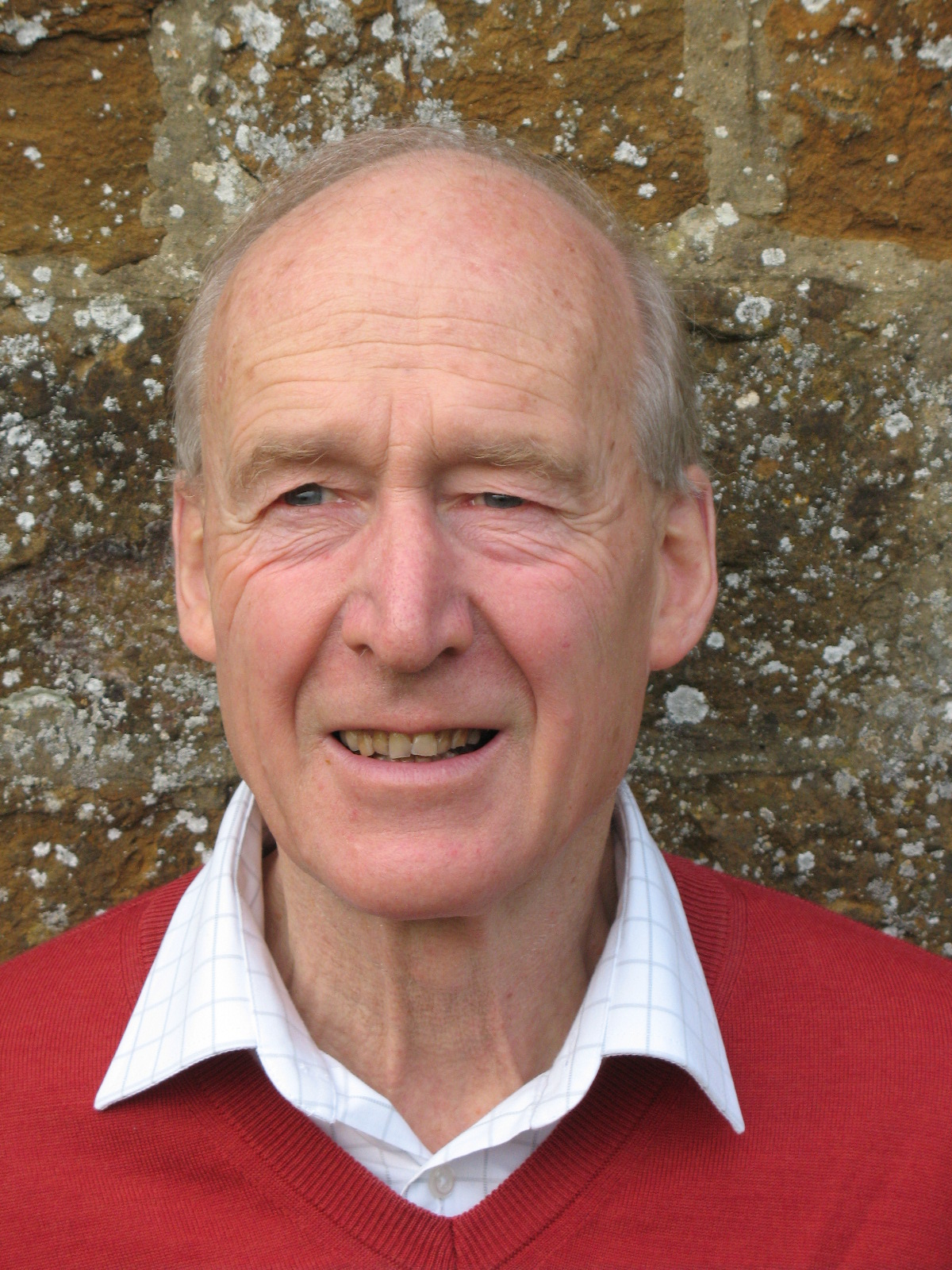
- Julian B. Barbour (2008)
- Born: 1937 (age 88–89)
- Education: University of Cambridge; University of Cologne
- Known for: Timeless physics (the thesis that time is an illusion); Shape dynamics
- Scientific career
- Fields: Theoretical physics, history of science

Julian Barbour (/ˈbɑːrbər/; born 1937) is a British physicist with research interests in quantum gravity and the history of science.

Since receiving his PhD degree on the foundations of Albert Einstein's general theory of relativity at the University of Cologne in 1968, Barbour has supported himself and his family without an academic position, working part-time as a translator (although he has an Oxford University email address and his research has been funded, for example by a FQXi grant). He resides near Banbury, England.

== Timeless physics ==
His 1999 book The End of Time advances timeless physics: the controversial view that time, as we perceive it, does not exist as anything other than an illusion, and that a number of problems in physical theory arise from assuming that it does exist. He argues that we have no evidence of the past other than our memory of it, and no evidence of the future other than our belief in it. "Difference merely creates an illusion of time, with each individual moment existing in its own right, complete and whole." He calls these moments "Nows". It is all an illusion: there is no motion and no change. He argues that the illusion of time is what we interpret through what he calls "time capsules", which are "any fixed pattern that creates or encodes the appearance of motion, change or history".

Barbour's theory goes further in scepticism than the block universe theory, since it denies not only the passage of time, but the existence of an external dimension of time. Physics orders "Nows" by their inherent similarity to each other. That ordering is what we conventionally call a time ordering, but does not come about from "Nows" occurring at specific times, since they do not occur, nor does it come about from their existing unchangingly along the time axis of a block universe, but it is rather derived from their actual content.

The philosopher J. M. E. McTaggart reached a similar conclusion in his 1908 "The Unreality of Time."

== Machian dynamics ==
Barbour also researches Machian physics, a related field. The Machian approach requires physics to be constructed from directly observable quantities. In standard analytical dynamics a system's future evolution can be determined from a state consisting of particle positions and momenta (or instantaneous velocities). Barbour believes that the Machian approach eschews the momenta/instantaneous velocities, which are not directly observable, and so needs more than one "snapshot" consisting of positions only. This relates to the idea of snapshots, or "Nows" in Barbour's thinking on time.

Along with physicist Bruno Bertotti, Barbour developed a technique called "best matching" for deriving gravitational equations directly from astronomical measurements of objects' spatial relations with each other. Published in 1982, the method describes gravitational effects as accurately as Einstein's general relativity, but without the need for a "background" grid of spacetime. According to physicist David Wiltshire at the University of Canterbury in New Zealand, such a truly Machian or relational approach could explain the appearance of an accelerated expansion of the universe without invoking a causative agent such as dark energy.

== Criticism of Barbour's ideas ==
Theoretical physicist Lee Smolin repeatedly refers to Barbour's ideas in his books. However Smolin is usually highly critical of Barbour's ideas, since Smolin is a proponent of a realist theory of time, where time is real and not a mere illusion as Barbour suggests. Smolin reasons that physicists have improperly rejected the reality of time because they confuse their mathematical models—which are timeless but deal in abstractions that do not exist—with reality. Smolin hypothesizes instead that the very laws of physics are not fixed, but that they actually evolve over time.

Theoretical physicist Sean Carroll has criticised Barbour and all physicists who adhere to a "timeless-view" of the universe:

The problem is not that I disagree with the timelessness crowd, it's that I don't see the point. I am not motivated to make the effort to carefully read what they are writing, because I am very unclear about what is to be gained by doing so. If anyone could spell out straightforwardly what I might be able to understand by thinking of the world in the language of timelessness, I'd be very happy to re-orient my attitude and take these works seriously.

== Political activity ==
In the October 1974 United Kingdom general election, Barbour stood as an Independent English Nationalist candidate in Banbury, receiving 547 votes. He later became active in the SDP.

== Books ==
=== Sole author ===
- 1999. The End of Time: The Next Revolution in our Understanding of the Universe. Oxford Univ. Press. ISBN 0-297-81985-2; ISBN 0-19-511729-8 (paperback: ISBN 0-7538-1020-4)
- 2001. The Discovery of Dynamics: A Study from a Machian Point of View of the Discovery and the Structure of Dynamical Theories. ISBN 0-19-513202-5. Paperback reprinting of Absolute or Relative Motion?.
- 1989. Absolute or Relative Motion?. ISBN 0-19-513203-3.
- 2020. The Janus Point: A New Theory of Time ISBN 978-0465095469 Basic Books.

=== Co-author ===
- 1982 (with B. Bertotti). Mach's Principle and the Structure of Dynamical Theories.
- 1994 (with Vladimir Pavlovich Vizgin) Unified Field Theories in the First Third of the 20th Century . ISBN 0-8176-2679-4.
- 1996 (with Herbert Pfister) Mach's Principle: From Newton's Bucket to Quantum Gravity. Birkhaueser. ISBN 0-8176-3823-7.

== See also ==
- Shape dynamics
