= Anupam Nath =

Indian photographer

- Born: 2 March 1971; Guwahati, Assam, India
- Occupation: Photographer

Anupam Nath is an international photojournalist from Assam. Nath's photo has been selected for the Time magazine's top 100 photos of 2017 list. He currently works as a photographer at Associated Press.

== Career ==
Nath has been covering events and happenings of the entire northeastern region of Assam since c. 1995. Starting his career as a photo journalist with a couple of Assamese dailies, Anupam went on to work as a stringer in Outlook. Later he worked as a staff photographer for the Hindustan Times and The Telegraph before joining the Associated Press in 2000.
