= Anupama (given name) =

- Gender: Female
- Language: Sanskrit

Origin
- Origin: Sanskrit
- Meaning: "incomparable"; "excellent"
- Region of origin: India

Other names
- Related names: Annupamaa, Anupam

Anupama (Devanagari: अनुपमा anupamā) is a Hindu feminine given name. In Sanskrit, it means "incomparable", or "excellent".

== Notable people named Anupama ==
- Anupama Aura Gurung (born 1988), Nepalese model and winner of the 2011 Miss Nepal Earth pageant
- Anupama Bhagwat (born 1974), Indian sitar player
- Anupama Chopra (born 1967), Indian writer, journalist and film critic
- Anupama Deshpande (born 1953), Indian playback singer, recipient of Filmfare Awards
- Anupama Gokhale (born 1969), Indian chess player
- Anupama Kumar (born 1974), Indian actress, model, journalist, anchor, visualizer and producer
- Anupama Mukti, Bangladeshi playback singer, recipient of Bachsas Awards
- Anupama Niranjana (1934 – 1991), Indian doctor and writer
- Anupama Raag, Indian singer and music director
- Anupama Verma (born 1965), Indian actress, model and television personality
- Anupama Parameswaran (born 1996), Indian actress, model and singer
- Annupamaa (born 1968), Indian playback singer
- Anupama Kundoo (born 1967), Indian architect
