= Anupam Mazumdar =

Theoretical physicist

- Born: Anupam Mazumdar
- Awards: JSPS Award, Japan, Inlaks Fellowship, India
- Scientific career
- Fields: Physics, Cosmology, Inflation (Cosmology), Quantum Gravity
- Workplaces: University of Sussex, Imperial College, London, ICTP, McGill University, Niels Bohr Institute, Lancaster University, University of Groningen
- Doctoral advisor: Andrew R. Liddle
- Website: http://www.rug.nl/staff/anupam.mazumdar/

Anupam Mazumdar is a theoretical physicist at the University of Groningen specializing in cosmology and quantum gravity.

Together with Sougato Bose, Mazumdar has proposed a bonafide test for the existence of the graviton in a table-top experiment, via witnessing gravitationally-mediated entanglement between two macroscopic superpositions of masses. A positive test of this phenomenon would establish experimentally that gravity is quantum mechanical in nature, and establish the existence of the graviton. The test crucially depends on the quantum nature of gravity, creating non-classical states of matter, and local operation and quantum communication (LOQC).

He has previously been affiliated to the Higgs Centre, at the University of Edinburgh, and the Discovery Center at the Niels Bohr Institute, Copenhagen.

His work has focused on multi field theories of inflation, such as assisted inflation, visible sector inflation such as MSSM inflation. He has worked on the ghost-free and singularity-free construction of infinite derivative theories of gravity, which can potentially resolve the Schwarzschild singularity for mini black holes, yielding a non-singular compact object without event horizon, and cosmological singularities. He has also conjectured with Koshelev that astrophysical black hole has no curvature singularity and devoid of an event horizon, in infinite derivative theories of gravity, because the scale of non-locality in gravitational interaction can engulf the gravitational radius of the compact object. At time scales and at distances below the effective scale of non-locality the gravitational interaction weakens sufficiently enough that a finite pressure from normal matter satisfying null, strong and weak energy conditions can avoid forming black holes with event horizons and cosmological singularities.
