= Nathalie Deruelle =

French physicist (born 1952)

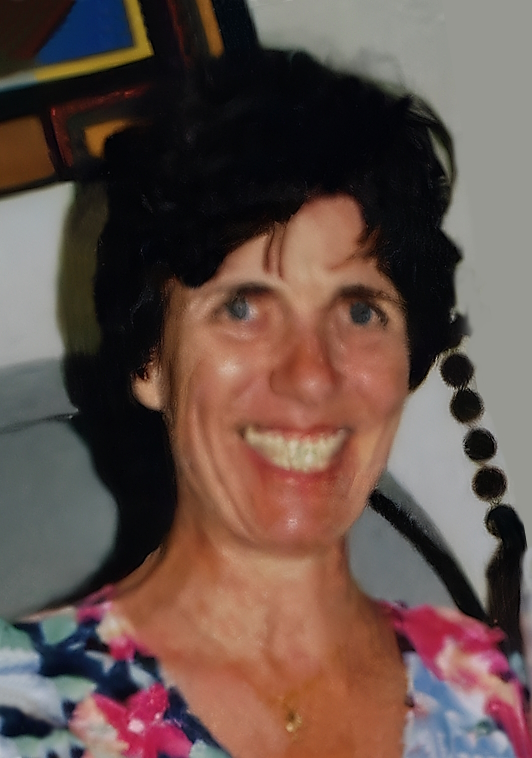
Nathalie Deruelle in 2005.

Nathalie Deruelle (born 1952) is a French physicist specializing in general relativity and known for her research on the two-body problem in general relativity and on cosmological perturbation theory.

== Education and career ==
Deruelle began her studies at the École normale supérieure in 1971, earned an agrégation in 1975, then, after visiting positions at the European Space Agency and the University of Cambridge, completed a doctorate in 1982 at Pierre and Marie Curie University.

Formerly a director of research for the French National Centre for Scientific Research, associated with Paris Diderot University, she is now listed as a researcher emeritus.

== Books ==
Deruelle is the author of books including:

- Relativity in Modern Physics (with Jean-Philippe Uzan, 2018) (translated by Patricia de Forcrand-Millard) ISBN 0198786395 LCCN 2018-933841
- Les ondes gravitationnelles (with Jean-Pierre Lasota, 2018) ISBN 2738143342
- De Pythagore à Einstein, tout est nombre : la relativité générale, 25 siècles d'histoire (2015) ISBN 2701195012
- Théories de la relativité (with Jean-Philippe Uzan, 2014) Deruelle, Nathalie; Uzan, Jean-Philippe (2019). Seconde édition. Revue et augmentée. Belin. ISBN 979-1035807016; 704 pages, pbk

== Recognition ==
Deruelle was named a Fellow of the International Society on General Relativity and Gravitation in 2013 "for her contributions to the two-body problem in general relativity and to relativistic cosmology".
