= Anupam Chander =

American lawyer (born 1967)

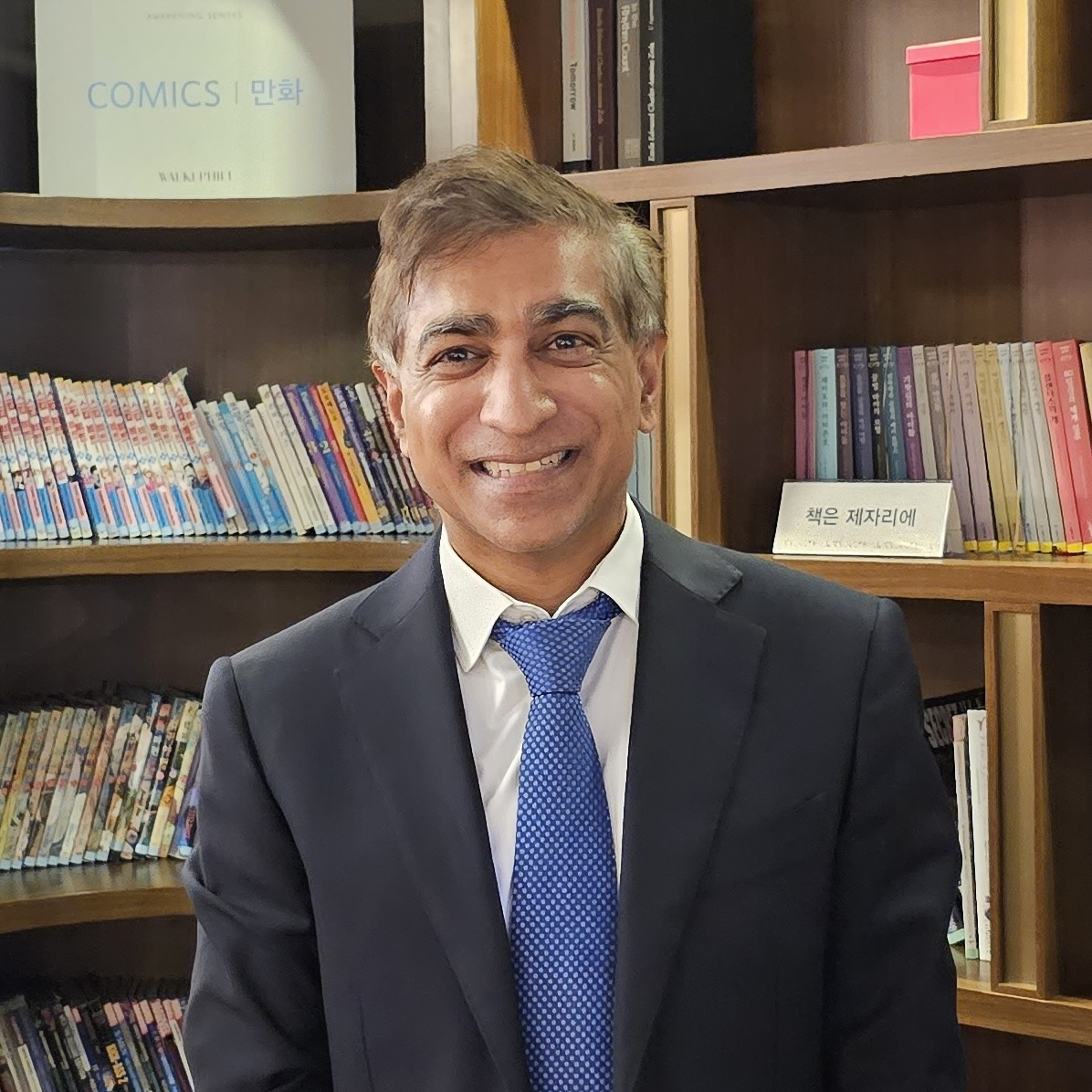
- Chander in 2023
- Born: 1967 (age 57–58)
- Citizenship: American
- Education: Harvard University (BA), Yale Law School (JD)
- Occupation: Lawyer
- Employer: Georgetown University Law Center
- Website: www.chander.org

Anupam Chander (born 1967) is an American lawyer. He is currently the Scott K Ginsburg Professor of Law at Georgetown University Law Center and an expert on the global regulation of new technologies.

== Education and career ==
Chander holds a B.A. from Harvard University. He received a J.D. from Yale Law School in 1992. After graduating, he served as a law clerk for Chief Judge Jon O. Newman of the Second Circuit Court of Appeals and Judge William A. Norris of the Ninth Circuit Court of Appeals. He has practiced law with Cleary, Gottlieb, Steen & Hamilton in New York and Hong Kong. Prior to his current position, Chander was a professor of law at the UC Davis School of Law and director of the California International Law Center.

== Publications ==
Chander is the author of numerous law review articles and has written three books: The Electronic Silk Road (2013), Internet Law: Statutory Supplement (2019), and Fred Korematsu: All American Hero (2011) with co-author Madhavi Sunder. He also edited Securing Privacy in the Internet Age (2008) with co-editors Lauren Gelman and Margaret Jane Radin.

The Electronic Silk Road has been reviewed by several academics and is regarded as a balanced and important contribution to discussion on internet law, international trade and globalization studies.

Chander's work has appeared in the Yale Law Journal, the California Law Review, and the American Journal of International Law.

== Public scholarship ==
In 2020, Chander was quoted in articles by Business Insider, CNN and Forbes regarding proposals by the Trump Administration to ban TikTok from the United States over national security and data privacy concerns. Chander wrote an opinion piece for the Washington Post on this issue and also appeared as a guest on NPR's Planet Money podcast.

== Grants and awards ==
In 2014, Chander received a Google Faculty Research Award for his research in policy and standards. In the same year, Chander and other University of California scholars received a grant of $175,000 from the Andrew W. Mellon Foundation to lead a Sawyer Seminar titled "Surveillance Democracies?" at UC Davis.
