= Constant-speed drive =

Type of gearbox used on jet engines

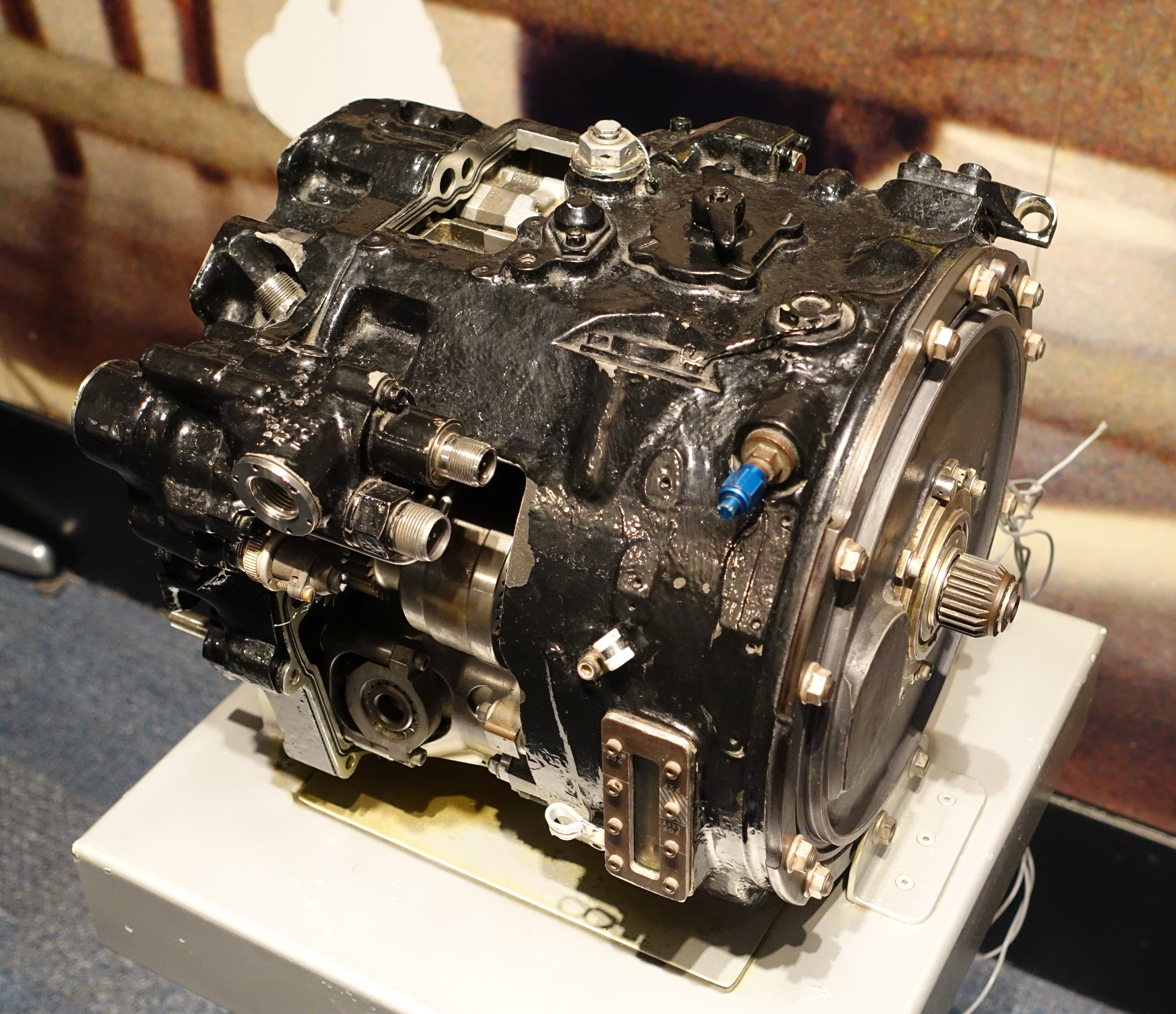
Constant-speed drive for Boeing 727, made by Sundstrand Corporation

A constant-speed drive (CSD), also known as a constant speed generator, is a type of transmission that takes an input shaft rotating at a wide range of speeds, delivering this power to an output shaft that rotates at a constant speed, despite the varying input. They are used to drive mechanisms, typically electrical generators, that require a constant input speed.

The term is most commonly applied to hydraulic transmissions found in the accessory drives of gas turbine engines, such as aircraft jet engines. On modern aircraft, the CSD is often combined with a generator into a single unit known as an integrated drive generator (IDG).

== Mechanism ==
CSDs are mainly used on airliner and military aircraft jet engines to drive the alternating current (AC) electrical generator. In order to produce the proper voltage at a constant AC frequency, usually three-phase 115 VAC at 400 Hz, an alternator needs to spin at a constant specific speed (typically 6,000 RPM for air-cooled generators). Since the jet engine gearbox speed varies from idle to full power, this creates the need for a constant-speed drive (CSD). The CSD takes the variable speed output of the accessory drive gearbox and hydro-mechanically produces a constant output RPM.

Different systems have been used to control the alternator speed. Modern designs are mostly hydrokinetic, but early designs often took advantage of the bleed air available from the engines. Some of these were mostly mechanically powered, with an air turbine to provide a vernier speed adjustment. Others were purely turbine-driven.

== Integrated-drive generator ==
On aircraft such as the Airbus A310, Airbus A320 family, Airbus A320neo, Airbus A330, Airbus A330neo, Airbus A340, Boeing 737 Next Generation, 747, 757, 767 and 777, an integrated-drive generator (IDG) is used. This unit is simply a CSD and an oil-cooled generator inside the same case. Troubleshooting is simplified as this unit is the line-replaceable electrical generation unit on the engine.

== Manufacturers ==
Collins Aerospace (formerly UTC Aerospace Systems (formerly Hamilton Sundstrand)) is an American manufacturer of CSD and IDG units.

== Alternatives ==
A variable-speed constant-frequency (VSCF) generator can be used to provide AC power using an electronic tap converter.

Variable-frequency starter–generators (VFSGs), used primarily on the Boeing 787, are used for both electric start and electricity generation.

An electronic power inverter can accept as input either AC of variable frequency and tension or DC of variable tension, e.g. from a permanent-magnet generator, and convert it to stable AC of constant (RMS) tension and frequency.

== See also ==
- Centrifugal governor
- Continuously variable transmission
