= Horizon (general relativity) =

Boundary in spacetime satisfying given conditions

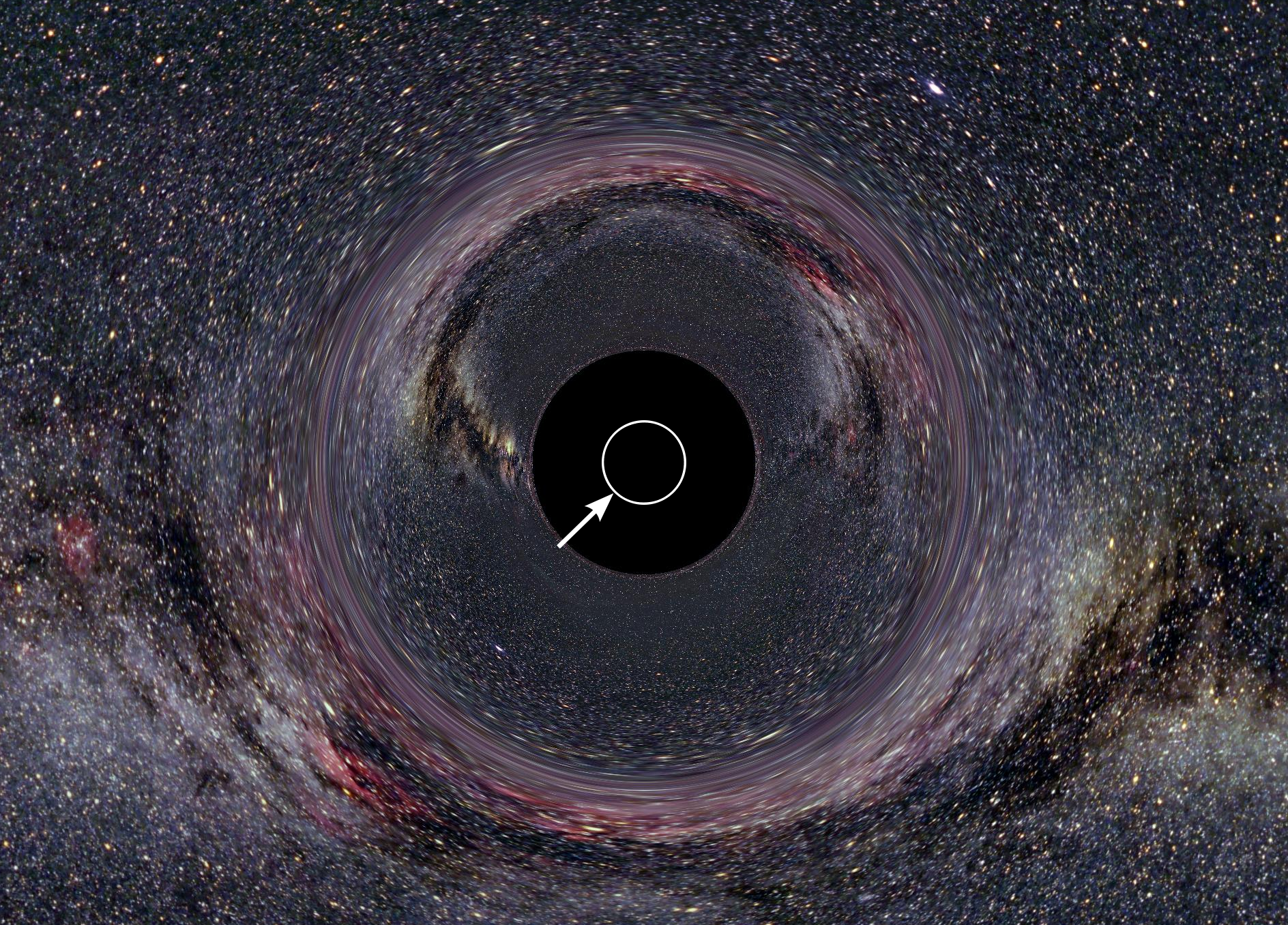
Illustration of the event horizon

A horizon is a boundary in spacetime satisfying prescribed conditions.

There are several types of horizons that play a role in Albert Einstein's theory of general relativity:

- Absolute horizon, a boundary in spacetime in general relativity inside of which events cannot affect an external observer
- Event horizon, a boundary in spacetime beyond which events cannot affect the observer, thus referring to a black hole's boundary and the boundary of an expanding universe
- Apparent horizon, a surface defined in general relativity
- Cauchy horizon, a surface found in the study of Cauchy problems
- Cosmological horizon, a limit of observability
- Killing horizon, a null surface on which there is a Killing vector field
- Particle horizon, the maximum distance from which particles can have travelled to an observer in the age of the universe

== See also ==
- Horizon (disambiguation)
