= Apparent horizon =

Alternative of event horizon first suggested by Stephen Hawking

In general relativity, an apparent horizon is a surface that is the boundary between light rays that are directed outwards and moving outwards and those directed outward but moving inward.

Apparent horizons are not invariant properties of spacetime, and in particular, they are distinct from event horizons. Within an apparent horizon, light does not move outward; this is in contrast with the event horizon. In a dynamical spacetime, there can be outgoing light rays exterior to an apparent horizon (but still interior to the event horizon). An apparent horizon is a local notion of the boundary of a black hole, whereas an event horizon is a global notion.

The notion of a horizon in general relativity is subtle and depends on fine distinctions.

== Definition ==
The notion of an "apparent horizon" begins with the notion of a trapped null surface. A (compact, orientable, spacelike) surface always has two independent forward-in-time pointing, lightlike, normal directions. For example, a (spacelike) sphere in Minkowski space has lightlike vectors pointing inward and outward along the radial direction. In Euclidean space (i.e. flat and unaffected by gravitational effects), the inward-pointing, lightlike normal vectors converge, while the outward-pointing, lightlike normal vectors diverge. It can, however, happen that both inward-pointing and outward-pointing lightlike normal vectors converge. In such a case, the surface is called trapped. The apparent horizon is the outermost of all trapped surfaces, also called the "marginally outer trapped surface" (MOTS).

== Differences from the (absolute) event horizon ==
In the context of black holes, the term event horizon refers almost exclusively to the notion of the "absolute horizon". Much confusion seems to arise concerning the differences between an apparent horizon (AH) and an event horizon (EH). In general, the two need not be the same. For example, in the case of a perturbed black hole, the EH and the AH generally do not coincide as long as either horizon fluctuates.

Event horizons can, in principle, arise and evolve in exactly flat regions of spacetime, having no black hole inside, if a hollow spherically symmetric thin shell of matter is collapsing in a vacuum spacetime. The exterior of the shell is a portion of Schwarzschild space and the interior of the hollow shell is exactly flat Minkowski space. Bob Geroch has pointed out that if all the stars in the Milky Way gradually aggregate towards the Galactic Center while keeping their proportionate distances from each other, they will all fall within their joint Schwarzschild radius long before they are forced to collide.

In the simple picture of stellar collapse leading to formation of a black hole, an event horizon forms before an apparent horizon. As the black hole settles down, the two horizons approach each other, and asymptotically become the same surface. If the null curvature condition $R_{\mu\nu} \ell^\mu \ell^\nu \geqslant 0$ (where $R_{\mu\nu}$ denotes the Ricci tensor and $\ell^\mu$ a null vector) is satisfied, then the apparent horizon is located inside the event horizon. The emission of Hawking radiation violates the weak and the null energy condition. In this case, a section of the apparent horizon is located outside of the event horizon.

Apparent horizons depend on the "slicing" of a spacetime. That is, the location and even existence of an apparent horizon depends on the way spacetime is divided into space and time. For example, it is possible to slice the Schwarzschild geometry in such a way that there is no apparent horizon, ever, despite the fact that there is certainly an event horizon.

== See also ==
- Absolute horizon
- Cauchy horizon
- Cosmological horizon
- Ergosphere
- Killing horizon
- Naked singularity
- Particle horizon
- Photon sphere
- Reissner–Nordström solution
