= Hubble volume =

Region of the observable universe

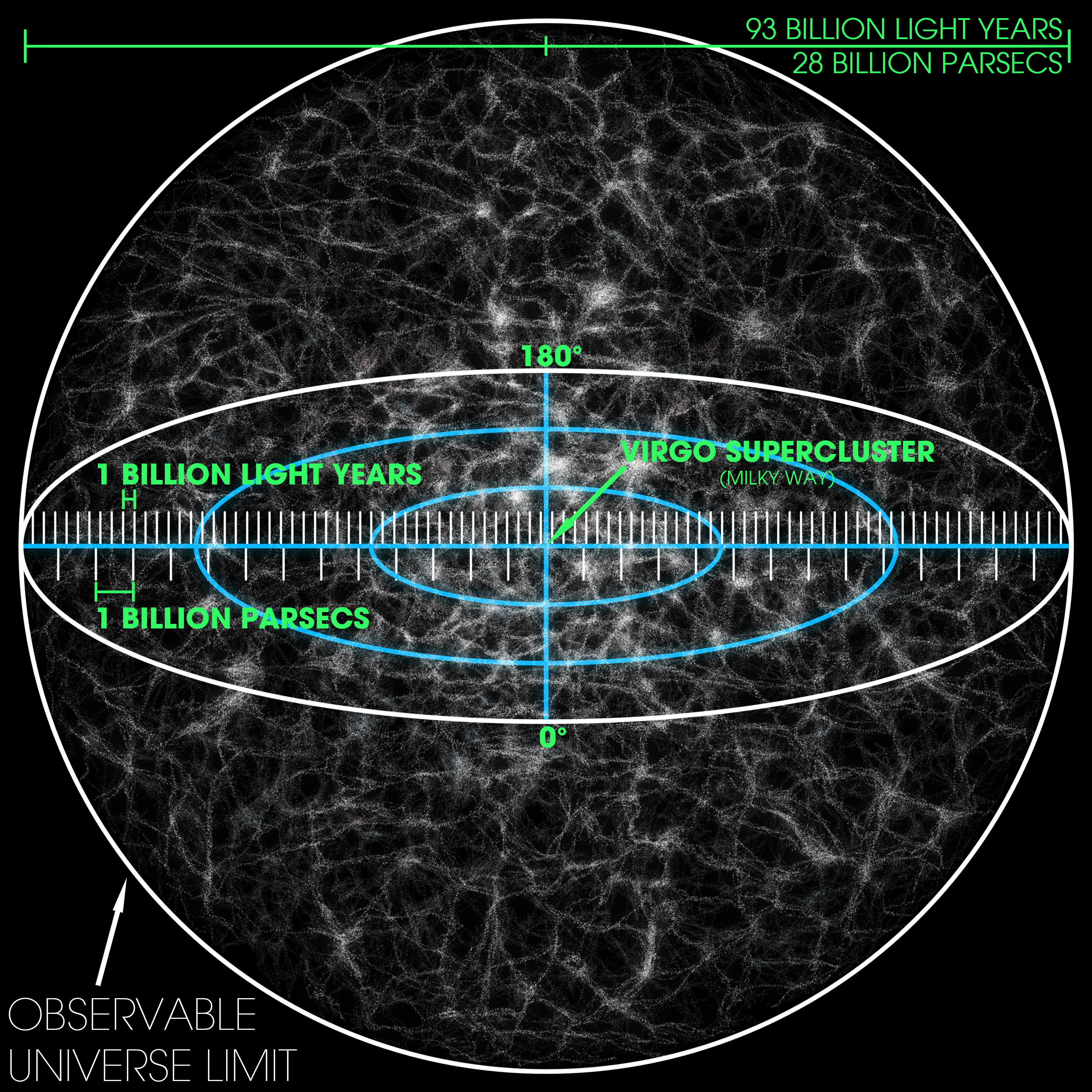
Visualization of the whole observable universe. The inner blue ring indicates the approximate size of the Hubble volume.

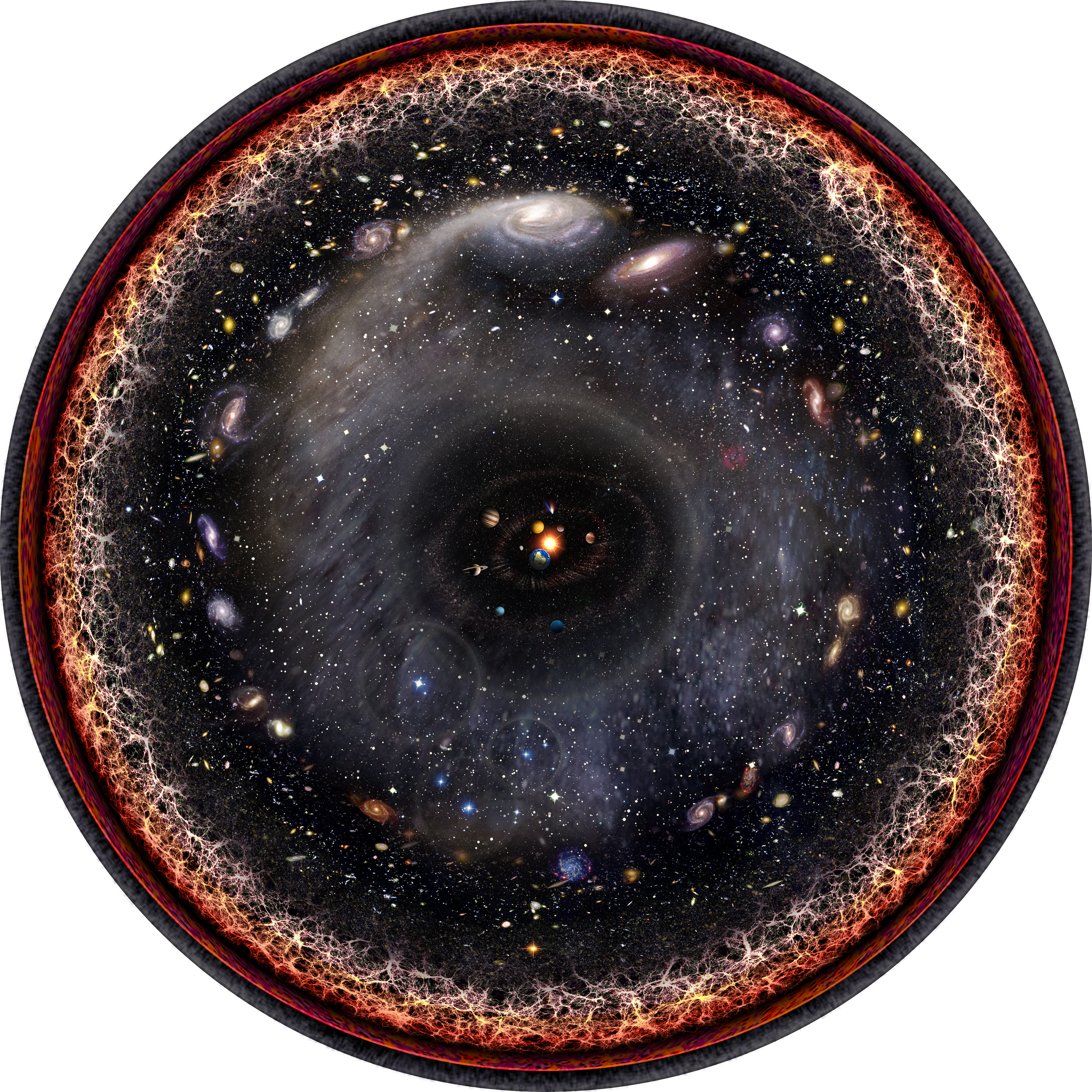
Circular representation of the observable universe on a logarithmic scale. Distance from Earth increases exponentially from center to edge. Celestial bodies were enlarged to appreciate their shapes.

In cosmology, a Hubble volume (named for the astronomer Edwin Hubble) or Hubble sphere, subluminal sphere, causal sphere and sphere of causality is a spherical region of the observable universe surrounding an observer beyond which objects recede from that observer at a rate greater than the speed of light due to the expansion of the universe. The Hubble volume is approximately equal to 10^{31} cubic light years (or about 10^{79} cubic meters).

The proper radius of a Hubble sphere (known as the Hubble radius or the Hubble length) is $c/H_0$, where $c$ is the speed of light and $H_0$ is the Hubble constant. The surface of a Hubble sphere is called the microphysical horizon, the Hubble surface, or the Hubble limit.

More generally, the term Hubble volume can be applied to any region of space with a volume of order $(c/H_0)^3$. However, the term is also frequently (but mistakenly) used as a synonym for the observable universe; the latter is larger than the Hubble volume.

The center of the Hubble volume and observable universe is arbitrary in relation to the overall universe; instead it is centered around its origin (impersonal or personal "observer").

The Hubble length $c/H_0$ is 14.4 billion light years in the standard cosmological model, equivalent to $c$ times Hubble time. The Hubble time is the reciprocal of the Hubble constant, and is slightly larger than the age of the universe (13.8 billion years) as it is the age the universe would have had if expansion was linear.

== Hubble limit as an event horizon ==
For objects at the Hubble limit, the space between us and the object of interest has an average expansion speed of c. So, in a universe with constant Hubble parameter, light emitted at the present time by objects outside the Hubble limit would never be seen by an observer on Earth. That is, the Hubble limit would coincide with a cosmological event horizon (a boundary separating events visible at some time and those that are never visible). See Hubble horizon for more details.

However, the Hubble parameter is not constant in various cosmological models so that the Hubble limit does not, in general, coincide with a cosmological event horizon. For example, in a decelerating Friedmann universe the Hubble sphere expands with time, and its boundary overtakes light emitted by more distant galaxies so that light emitted at earlier times by objects outside the Hubble volume still may eventually arrive inside the sphere and be seen by us. Similarly, in an accelerating universe with a decreasing Hubble constant, the Hubble volume expands with time and can overtake light from sources previously receding relative to us. In both of these circumstances, the cosmological event horizon lies beyond the Hubble Horizon. In a universe with an increasing Hubble constant, the Hubble horizon will contract, and its boundary overtakes light emitted by nearer galaxies so that light emitted at earlier times by objects inside the Hubble sphere will eventually recede outside the sphere and will never be seen by us. If the shrinkage of the Hubble volume does not stop due to some yet unknown phenomenon (one suggestion is the "early phase transition"), the Hubble volume will become nearly a point (due to the uncertainty principle pure singularities are impossible; also a proportion of their self-interactions are energetic enough to produce escaping particles via quantum tunneling), meeting the criteria of big bang. The justification of this view is that no subluminal Hubble volume will exist and pointwise superluminal expansion (the generalization of the Big Bang theory) will prevail everywhere or at least in a vast region of the universe. In this cyclic cosmology (there are many other cyclic versions) the universe always expands and does not revert to a smaller default size (non-conformal or expandatory conformal, non-Penrosean expandatory cyclic cosmology).

Observations indicate that the expansion of the universe is accelerating, and the Hubble constant is thought to be decreasing. Thus, sources of light outside the Hubble horizon but inside the cosmological event horizon can eventually reach us. A fairly counter-intuitive result is that photons we observe from the first ~5 billion years of the universe come from regions that are, and always have been, receding from us at superluminal speeds.

== See also ==
- Hubble's law
- Hubble horizon
- Particle horizon
