= Topological star =

Hypothetical horizonless compact object in general relativity

In physics, a topological star (also called a topological soliton in this context) is a smooth, horizonless solution of the five-dimensional Einstein–Maxwell equations whose interior contains non-trivial topological cycles threaded by magnetic flux. Upon Kaluza–Klein reduction to four dimensions, these spacetimes can mimic aspects of magnetized black holes, while avoiding curvature singularities and event horizons.

== History ==
The concept was introduced by Ibrahima Bah and Pierre Heidmann in November 2020 as a preprint on ArXiv. A follow-up paper appeared in December 2020 with a more general class of solutions. These works were later peer-reviewed and published in Physical Review Letters and the Journal of High Energy Physics in 2021. Subsequent research extended their proposal to study observational properties. In 2023 Bah, Heidmann, and Emanuele Berti published a paper on how topological stars could be imaged and how their photon rings and shadows might differ from those of black holes.

== Theory ==
Topological stars are smooth "bubble" geometries in five dimensions in which flux wraps compact topological cycles. The solutions can be macroscopically larger than the Kaluza–Klein circle and live in the same parameter regime as non-extremal charged black strings that reduce to magnetized black holes in four dimensions. They provide horizonless caps that resolve interior singularities while reproducing some exterior properties associated with black holes.

== Observational signatures ==
Numerical imaging suggests that a topological star can closely imitate the gravitational lensing and shadow of a black hole, potentially complicating observational discrimination based solely on silhouette, although fine structure in the photon ring may differ. Popular summaries emphasized that these objects are theoretical models rather than confirmed astrophysical bodies.

== Relation to other proposals ==
Topological stars are part of a broader class of horizonless compact object models and have been discussed in connection with black hole microstate (fuzzball) ideas and other exotic compact objects. Analyses have also explored perturbative stability properties and possible instabilities in related setups.

== See also ==
- Boson star
