= Trapped surface =

Concept used in black hole solutions

Closed trapped surfaces are a concept used in black hole solutions of general relativity which describe the inner region of an event horizon. Roger Penrose defined the notion of closed trapped surfaces in 1965. A trapped surface is one where light is not moving away from the black hole. The boundary of the union of all trapped surfaces around a black hole is called an apparent horizon.

A related term trapped null surface is often used interchangeably. However, when discussing causal horizons, trapped null surfaces are defined as only null vector fields giving rise to null surfaces. But marginally trapped surfaces may be spacelike, timelike or null.

== Definition ==
They are spacelike surfaces (topological spheres, tubes, etc.) with restricted bounds, their area tending to decrease locally along any possible future direction and with a dual definition with respect to the past. The trapped surface is a spacelike surface of co-dimension 2, in a Lorentzian spacetime. It follows that any normal vector can be expressed as a linear combination of two future directed null vectors, normalised by:
$$k_+\cdot k_-=-2$$
The $k_+$ vector is directed "outwards" and $k_-$ "inwards". The set of all such vectors engenders one outgoing and one ingoing null congruence. The surface is designated trapped if the cross sections of both congruences decrease in area as they exit the surface; and this is apparent in the mean curvature vector, which is:
$$H^\alpha=-\theta_+k_-^\alpha-\theta_-k_+^\alpha$$
The surface is trapped if both the null expansions $\theta_\pm$ are negative, signifying that the mean curvature vector is timelike and future directed. The surface is marginally trapped if the outer expansion $\theta_+=0$ and the inner expansion $\theta_-\le 0$.

== Trapped null surface ==
A trapped null surface is a set of points defined in the context of general relativity as a closed surface on which outward-pointing light rays are actually converging (moving inwards).

Trapped null surfaces are used in the definition of the apparent horizon which typically surrounds a black hole.

=== Definition ===
We take a (compact, orientable, spacelike) surface, and find its outward pointing normal vectors. The basic picture to think of here is a ball with pins sticking out of it; the pins are the normal vectors.

Now we look at light rays that are directed outward, along these normal vectors. The rays will either be diverging (the usual case one would expect) or converging. Intuitively, if the light rays are converging, this means that the light is moving backwards inside of the ball. If all the rays around the entire surface are converging, we say that there is a trapped null surface.

More formally, if every null congruence orthogonal to a spacelike two-surface has negative expansion, then such surface is said to be trapped.

== See also ==
- Null hypersurface
- Raychaudhuri equation
