= Neh =

Neh or NEH may refer to:

== Places ==
- Neh, Iran, a city in South Khorasan Province, Iran
- Neh, Kurdistan, a city in Kurdistan Province, Iran
- Neh Rural District, an administrative subdivision of South Khorasan Province, Iran

== Abbreviations and acronyms ==
- N-Ethylhexedrone, a stimulant drug
- Neutrophilic eccrine hidradenitis, a cutaneous complication of chemotherapy
- National Endowment for the Humanities, a US government agency
- The Book of Nehemiah (Neh.), in the Hebrew Bible
- New English Hymnal, a book of hymns etc.
- North East Humanists, England
- Non-expanding horizon of a black hole
- Netherlands School of Economics (Nederlandse Economische Hogeschool), now Erasmus University Rotterdam
- Neonium, the ion NeH^{+}
- The National Rail station code for New Eltham railway station, London, England
