= Causality (physics) =

Physics of the cause–effect relation

In physics, causality requires the cause of an event to be in the past light cone of the result and to be ultimately reducible to fundamental interactions. Similarly, a cause cannot have an effect outside its future light cone.

== Macroscopic vs microscopic causality ==
Causality can be defined macroscopically, at the level of human observers, or microscopically, for fundamental events at the atomic level. The strong causality principle forbids information transfer faster than the speed of light; the weak causality principle operates at the microscopic level and need not lead to information transfer. Physical models can obey the weak principle without obeying the strong version. In the algebraic formulation of quantum field theory, microscopic causality is taken as an axiom, formulated technically but equivalent to the idea that two measurements in different places at the same time cannot affect each other.

== Macroscopic causality ==
In classical physics, an effect cannot occur before its cause which is why solutions such as the advanced time solutions of the Liénard–Wiechert potential are discarded as physically meaningless. In both Einstein's theories of special and general relativity, causality means that an effect cannot occur from a cause that is not in the back (past) light cone of that event. Similarly, a cause cannot have an effect outside its front (future) light cone. These restrictions are consistent with the constraint that mass and energy that act as causal influences cannot travel faster than the speed of light and/or backwards in time.

Another requirement of causality is that cause and effect be mediated across space and time (requirement of contiguity). This requirement has been very influential in the past, in the first place as a result of direct observation of causal processes (like pushing a cart), in the second place as a problematic aspect of Newton's theory of gravitation (attraction of the earth by the sun by means of action at a distance) replacing mechanistic proposals like Descartes's vortex theory; in the third place as an incentive to develop dynamic field theories (e.g., Maxwell's electrodynamics and Einstein's general theory of relativity) restoring contiguity in the transmission of influences in a more successful way than in Descartes's theory.

== Simultaneity ==
In modern physics, the notion of causality had to be clarified. The word simultaneous is observer-dependent in special relativity. The principle is relativity of simultaneity. Consequently, the relativistic principle of causality says that the cause must precede its effect according to all inertial observers. This is equivalent to the statement that the cause and its effect are separated by a timelike interval, and the effect belongs to the future of its cause. If a timelike interval separates the two events, this means that a signal could be sent between them at less than the speed of light. On the other hand, if signals could move faster than the speed of light, this would violate causality because it would allow a signal to be sent across spacelike intervals, which means that at least to some inertial observers the signal would travel backward in time. For this reason, special relativity does not allow communication faster than the speed of light.

In the theory of general relativity, the concept of causality is generalized in the most straightforward way: the effect must belong to the future light cone of its cause, even if the spacetime is curved. New subtleties must be taken into account when we investigate causality in quantum mechanics and relativistic quantum field theory in particular. In those two theories, causality is closely related to the principle of locality. Bell's Theorem shows that conditions of "local causality" in experiments involving quantum entanglement result in non-classical correlations predicted by quantum mechanics.

Despite these subtleties, causality remains an important and valid concept in physical theories. For example, the notion that events can be ordered into causes and effects is necessary to prevent (or at least outline) causality paradoxes such as the grandfather paradox, which asks what happens if a time-traveler kills his own grandfather before he ever meets the time-traveler's grandmother. See also Chronology protection conjecture.

== Distributed causality ==
Theories in physics like the butterfly effect from chaos theory open up the possibility of a type of distributed parameter systems in causality. The butterfly effect theory proposes:

"Small variations of the initial condition of a nonlinear dynamical system may produce large variations in the long term behavior of the system."

This opens up the opportunity to understand a distributed causality.

A related way to interpret the butterfly effect is to see it as highlighting the difference between the application of the notion of causality in physics and a more general use of causality as represented by Mackie's INUS conditions. In classical (Newtonian) physics, in general, only those conditions are (explicitly) taken into account, that are both necessary and sufficient. For instance, when a massive sphere is caused to roll down a slope starting from a point of unstable equilibrium, then its velocity is assumed to be caused by the force of gravity accelerating it; the small push that was needed to set it into motion is not explicitly dealt with as a cause. In order to be a physical cause there must be a certain proportionality with the ensuing effect. A distinction is drawn between triggering and causation of the ball's motion. By the same token the butterfly can be seen as triggering a tornado, its cause being assumed to be seated in the atmospherical energies already present beforehand, rather than in the movements of a butterfly.

== Causal sets ==
In causal set theory, causality takes an even more prominent place. The basis for this approach to quantum gravity is in a theorem by David Malament. This theorem states that the causal structure of a spacetime suffices to reconstruct its conformal class, so knowing the conformal factor and the causal structure is enough to know the spacetime. Based on this, Rafael Sorkin proposed the idea of Causal Set Theory, which is a fundamentally discrete approach to quantum gravity. The causal structure of the spacetime is represented as a poset, while the conformal factor can be reconstructed by identifying each poset element with a unit volume.

== See also ==
- Causality – How one process influences another (general)
- Causal contact – Sharing an event that affects entities in a causal way
- Causal system – System where the output depends only on past and current inputs
- Particle horizon – Distance measurement used in cosmology
- Philosophy of physics – Truths and principles of the study of matter, space, time and energy
- Retrocausality – Mathematical technique in physics
- Synchronicity – Jungian concept of the meaningfulness of acausal coincidences
- Wheeler–Feynman time-symmetric theory for electrodynamics – Interpretation of electrodynamics
