= Isolated horizon =

Type of spacetime horizon

It was customary to represent black hole horizons via stationary solutions of field equations, i.e., solutions which admit a time-translational Killing vector field everywhere, not just in a small neighborhood of the black hole. While this simple idealization was natural as a starting point, it is overly restrictive. Physically, it should be sufficient to impose boundary conditions at the horizon which ensure only that the black hole itself is isolated. That is, it should suffice to demand only that the intrinsic geometry of the horizon be time independent, whereas the geometry outside may be dynamical and admit gravitational and other radiation.

An advantage of isolated horizons over event horizons is that while one needs the entire spacetime history to locate an event horizon, isolated horizons are defined using local spacetime structures only. The laws of black hole mechanics, initially proved for event horizons, are generalized to isolated horizons.

An isolated horizon $(\Delta\,,[\ell])$ refers to the quasilocal definition of a black hole which is in equilibrium with its exterior, and both the intrinsic and extrinsic structures of an isolated horizon (IH) are preserved by the null equivalence class $[\ell]$. The concept of IHs is developed based on the ideas of non-expanding horizons (NEHs) and weakly isolated horizons (WIHs): A NEH is a null surface whose intrinsic structure is preserved and constitutes the geometric prototype of WIHs and IHs, while a WIH is a NEH with a well-defined surface gravity and based on which the black-hole mechanics can be quasilocally generalized.

== Definition of IHs ==
A three-dimensional submanifold $\Delta$ equipped with an equivalence class $[\ell]$ is defined as an IH if it respects the following conditions:

(i) $\Delta$ is null and topologically $S^2\times\mathbb{R}$;
(ii) Along any null normal field $l$ tangent to $\Delta$, the outgoing expansion rate $\displaystyle \theta_{(l)}:=\hat{h}^{ab}\hat{\nabla}_a l_b$ vanishes;
(iii) All field equations hold on $\Delta$, and the stress–energy tensor $T_{ab}$ on $\Delta$ is such that $V^a:=-T^a_b l^b$ is a future-directed causal vector ($V^a V_a\leq 0$) for any future-directed null normal $l^a$.
(iv) The commutator $[\mathcal{L}_\ell, \mathcal{D}_a]=0$, where $\mathcal{D}_a$ denotes the induced connection on the horizon.

Note: Following the convention set up in refs., "hat" over the equality symbol $\hat=$ means equality on the black-hole horizons (NEHs), and "hat" over quantities and operators ($\hat h^{ab}$, $\hat\nabla$, etc.) denotes those on the horizon or on a foliation leaf of the horizon (this makes no difference for IHs).

== Boundary conditions of IHs ==
The properties of a generic IH manifest themselves as a set of boundary conditions expressed in the language of Newman–Penrose formalism,

$\kappa\,\hat{=}\,0$ (geodesic), $\text{Im}(\rho)\,\hat{=}\,0$ (twist-free, hypersurface orthogonal), $\text{Re}(\rho)\,\hat{=}\,0$ (expansion-free), $\sigma\,\hat{=}\,0$ (shear-free),

$\Phi_{00}\,\hat{=}\,0\,,\quad \Phi_{10}=\overline{\Phi_{01}}\,\hat{=}\,0$ (no flux of any kinds of matter charges across the horizon),

$\Psi_0\,\hat{=}\,0\,,\quad \Psi_1\,\hat{=}\,0$ (no gravitational waves across the horizon).

In addition, for an electromagnetic IH,

$\phi_0\,\hat{=}\,0\,,\quad\Phi_{02}=\overline{\Phi_{20}}=\,2\,\phi_0\,\overline{\phi_2}\,\hat{=}\,0\,.$

Moreover, in a tetrad adapted to the IH structure, we have

$\pi\,\hat{=}\,\alpha+\bar{\beta} \,,\quad \varepsilon\,\hat{=}\,\bar{\varepsilon} \,,\quad \bar{\mu}\,\hat{=}\,\mu\,.$

Remark: In fact, these boundary conditions of IHs just inherit those of NEHs.

== Extension of the on-horizon adapted tetrad ==
Full analysis of the geometry and mechanics of an IH relies on the on-horizon adapted tetrad. However, a more comprehensive view of IHs often requires investigation of the near-horizon vicinity and off-horizon exterior. The adapted tetrad on an IH can be smoothly extended to the following form which cover both the horizon and off-horizon regions,

$l^a\partial_a=\partial_v +U\partial_r +X^3\partial_y+X^4 \partial_{ z } \,,$
$n^a\partial_a=-\partial_r \,,$
$m^a\partial_a=\Omega\partial_r+\xi^3\partial_y +\xi^4\partial_{ z } \,,$
$\bar{m}^a\partial_a=\bar{\Omega}\partial_r +\bar{\xi}^3\partial_{ y}+\bar{\xi}^4\partial_{ z } \,.$

where $\{y,z\}$ are either real isothermal coordinates or complex stereographic coordinates labeling the cross-sections of { v=constant, r=constant}, and the gauge conditions in this tetrad are
$\nu=\tau=\gamma=0\,,\quad \mu=\bar\mu\,,\quad \pi=\alpha+\bar\beta\,.$

== Applications ==
The local nature of the definition of an isolated horizon makes it more convenient for numerical studies.

The local nature makes the Hamiltonian description viable. This framework offers a natural point of departure for non-perturbative quantization and derivation of black hole entropy from microscopic degrees of freedom.

== See also ==
- Non-expanding horizon
- Newman–Penrose formalism
