= Non-expanding horizon =

Type of spacetime horizon

A non-expanding horizon (NEH) is an enclosed null surface whose intrinsic structure is preserved. An NEH is the geometric prototype of an isolated horizon which describes a black hole in equilibrium with its exterior from the quasilocal perspective. It is based on the concept and geometry of NEHs that the two quasilocal definitions of black holes, weakly isolated horizons and isolated horizons, are developed.

== Definition of NEHs ==
A three-dimensional submanifold ∆ is defined as a generic (rotating and distorted) NEH if it respects the following conditions:

(i) ∆ is null and topologically $S^2\times\mathbb{R}$;
(ii) Along any null normal field $l$ tangent to ∆, the outgoing expansion rate $\displaystyle \theta_{(l)}:=\hat{h}^{ab}\hat{\nabla}_a l_b$ vanishes;
(iii) All field equations hold on ∆, and the stress–energy tensor $T_{ab}$ on ∆ is such that $V^a:=-T^a_b l^b$ is a future-directed causal vector ($V^a V_a\leq 0$) for any future-directed null normal $l^a$.

Condition (i) is fairly trivial and just states the general fact that from a 3+1 perspective an NEH ∆ is foliated by spacelike 2-spheres ∆'=S^{2}, where S^{2} emphasizes that ∆' is topologically compact with genus zero ($g=0$). The signature of ∆ is (0,+,+) with a degenerate temporal coordinate, and the intrinsic geometry of a foliation leaf ∆'=S^{2} is nonevolutional. The property $\theta_{(l)}=0$ in condition (ii) plays a pivotal role in defining NEHs and the rich implications encoded therein will be extensively discussed below. Condition (iii) makes one feel free to apply the Newman–Penrose (NP) formalism of Einstein-Maxwell field equations to the horizon and its near-horizon vicinity; furthermore, the very energy inequality is motivated from the dominant energy condition and is a sufficient condition for deriving many boundary conditions of NEHs.

Note: In this article, following the convention set up in refs., "hat" over the equality symbol $\hat=$ means equality on the black-hole horizons (NEHs), and "hat" over quantities and operators ($\hat h^{ab}$, $\hat\nabla$, etc.) denotes those on a foliation leaf of the horizon. Also, ∆ is the standard symbol for both an NEH and the directional derivative ∆$:=n^a\nabla_a$ in NP formalism, and we believe this won't cause an ambiguity.

== Boundary conditions implied by the definition ==
Now let's work out the implications of the definition of NEHs, and these results will be expressed in the language of NP formalism with the convention $\{(-,+,+,+); l^an_a=-1, m^a\bar{m}_a=1\}$ (Note: unlike the original convention $\{(+,-,-,-); l^an_a=1, m^a\bar{m}_a=-1\}$, this is the usual one employed in studying trapped null surfaces and quasilocal definitions of black holes). Being a null normal to ∆, $l^a$ is automatically geodesic, $\kappa:= -m^al^b\nabla_b l_a\,\hat{=}\,0$, and twist free, $\text{Im}(\rho)=\text{Im}(-m^a \bar{m}^b \nabla_b l_a )\,\hat{=}\,0$. For an NEH, the outgoing expansion rate $\theta_{(l)}$ along $l^a$ is vanishing, $\theta_{(l)}\,\hat{=}\,0$, and consequently $\text{Re}(\rho)=\text{Re}(-m^a \bar{m}^b \nabla_b l_a )=- \frac{1}{2}\theta_{(l)}\,\hat{=}\,0$. Moreover, according to the Raychaudhuri-NP expansion-twist equation,

$$(1)\qquad D\rho=\rho^2+\sigma\bar{\sigma}+\frac{1}{2}R_{ab}l^a l^b\,\hat{=}\,0\,,$$

it follows that on ∆

$$(2)\qquad \sigma\bar{\sigma}+\frac{1}{2}R_{ab}l^a l^b\,\hat{=}\,0\,,$$

where $\sigma:= -m^b m^a \nabla_a l_b$ is the NP-shear coefficient. Due to the assumed energy condition (iii), we have $R_{ab}l^a l^b=R_{ab}l^a l^b-\frac{1}{2}Rg_{ab}l^al^b=8\pi \, T_{ab}l^a l^b$ ($c=G=1$), and therefore $R_{ab}l^a l^b$ is nonnegative on ∆. The product $\sigma\bar{\sigma}$ is of course nonnegative, too. Consequently, $\sigma\bar{\sigma}$ and $R_{ab}l^a l^b$ must be simultaneously zero on ∆, i.e. $\sigma\,\hat{=}\,0$ and $R_{ab}l^a l^b\,\hat{=}\,0$. As a summary,

$$(3)\qquad \kappa\,\hat{=}\,0\,,\quad\text{Im}(\rho)\,\hat{=}\,0\,,\quad \text{Re}(\rho)\,\hat{=}\,0\,,\quad\sigma\,\hat{=}\,0\,,\quad R_{ab}l^a l^b\,\hat{=}\,0.$$

Thus, the isolated horizon ∆ is nonevolutional and all foliation leaves ∆'=S^{2} look identical with one another. The relation $R_{ab}l^a l^b=8\pi \cdot T_{ab}l^a l^b=8\pi \cdot T^a_{b} l^b\cdot l_a\,\hat{=}\,0$ implies that the causal vector $-T^a_b l^b$ in condition (iii) is proportional to $l^a$ and $R_{ab}l^b$ is proportional to $l_a$ on the horizon ∆; that is, $-T^a_b l^b\,\hat{=}\,cl^a$ and $R_{ab}l^b\,\hat{=}\,cl_a$, $c\in\mathbb{R}$. Applying this result to the related Ricci-NP scalars, we get $\Phi_{00}:= \frac{1}{2}R_{ab}l^a l^b\,\hat{=}\,\frac{c}{2}\,l_b l^b\,\hat{=}\,0$, and $\Phi_{01}=\overline{\Phi_{10}}:= \frac{1}{2}R_{ab}l^a m^b\,\hat{=}\,\frac{c}{2}\,l_b m^b\,\hat{=}\,0$, thus

$$(4)\qquad R_{ab}l^b\,\hat{=}\,cl_a\,,\quad \Phi_{00}\,\hat{=}\,0\,,\quad \Phi_{10}=\overline{\Phi_{01}}\,\hat{=}\,0\,.$$

The vanishing of Ricci-NP scalars $\{\Phi_{00}\,,\Phi_{01}\,, \Phi_{10}\}$ signifies that, there is no energy–momentum flux of any kind of charge across the horizon, such as electromagnetic waves, Yang–Mills flux or dilaton flux. Also, there should be no gravitational waves crossing the horizon; however, gravitational waves are propagation of perturbations of the spacetime continuum rather than flows of charges, and therefore depicted by four Weyl-NP scalars $\Psi_i\; (i=0,1,3,4)$ (excluding $\Psi_2$) rather than Ricci-NP quantities $\Phi_{ij}$. According to the Raychaudhuri-NP shear equation

$$(5)\qquad D\sigma=\sigma(\rho+\bar\rho)+\Psi_0=-2\sigma\theta_{(l)}+\Psi_0\,,$$

or the NP field equation on the horizon

$$(6)\qquad D\sigma-\delta\kappa=(\rho+\bar{\rho})\sigma+(3\varepsilon-\bar{\varepsilon})\sigma-(\tau-\bar{\pi}+\bar{\alpha}+3\beta)\kappa+\Psi_0\,\hat{=}\,0\,,$$

it follows that $\Psi_0:= C_{abcd} l^a m^b l^c m^d\,\hat{=}\,0$. Moreover, the NP equation

$$(7)\qquad \delta\rho-\bar{\delta}\sigma=\rho(\bar{\alpha}+\beta)-\sigma(3\alpha-\bar{\beta})+(\rho-\bar{\rho})\tau+(\mu-\bar{\mu})\kappa-\Psi_1+\Phi_{01}\,\hat{=}\,0$$

implies that $\Psi_1:= C_{abcd} l^a n^b l^c m^d\,\hat{=}\,0$. To sum up, we have

$$(8)\qquad \Psi_0\,\hat{=}\,0\,,\quad \Psi_1\,\hat{=}\,0\,,$$

which means that, geometrically, a principal null direction of Weyl's tensor is repeated twice and $l^a$ is aligned with the principal direction; physically, no gravitational waves (transverse component $\Psi_0$ and longitudinal component $\Psi_1$) enter the black hole. This result is consistent with the physical scenario defining NEHs.

== Remarks: Spin coefficients related to Raychaudhuri's equation ==
For a better understanding of the previous section, we will briefly review the meanings of relevant NP spin coefficients in depicting null congruences. The tensor form of Raychaudhuri's equation governing null flows reads

$$(9)\qquad \mathcal{L}_{\ell}\theta_{(l)}=-\frac{1}{2}\theta_{(l)}^2+\tilde{\kappa}_{(l)}\theta_{(l)}-\sigma_{ab}\sigma^{ab}+\tilde{\omega}_{ab}\tilde{\omega}^{ab}-R_{ab}l^a l^b\,,$$

where $\tilde{\kappa}_{(l)}$ is defined such that $\tilde{\kappa}_{(l)}l^b:= l^a \nabla_a l^b$. The quantities in Raychaudhuri's equation are related with the spin coefficients via

$$(10)\qquad \theta_{(l)}=-(\rho+\bar\rho)=-2\text{Re}(\rho)\,,\quad \theta_{(n)}=\mu+\bar\mu=2\text{Re}(\mu)\,,$$

$$(11)\qquad \sigma_{ab}=-\sigma \bar m_a \bar m_b-\bar\sigma m_a m_b\,,$$

$$(12)\qquad \tilde{\omega}_{ab}=\frac{1}{2}\,\Big(\rho-\bar\rho \Big)\,\Big(m_a \bar m_b-\bar m_a m_b \Big)=\text{Im}(\rho)\cdot\Big(m_a \bar m_b-\bar m_a m_b \Big)\,,$$

where Eq(10) follows directly from $\hat{h}^{ab}=\hat{h}^{ba}=m^b\bar m^a+\bar m^b m^a$ and

$$(13)\qquad \theta_{(l)}=\hat{h}^{ba}\nabla_a l_b=m^b\bar m^a\nabla_a l_b+\bar m^b m^a\nabla_a l_b =m^b\bar \delta l_b+\bar m^b \delta l_b=-(\rho+\bar\rho)\,,$$

$$(14)\qquad \theta_{(n)}=\hat{h}^{ba}\nabla_a n_b=\bar m^b m^a\nabla_a n_b+m^b\bar m^a\nabla_a n_b=\bar m^b \delta n_b+m^b\bar \delta n_b=\mu+\bar\mu\,.$$

Moreover, a null congruence is hypersurface orthogonal if $\text{Im}(\rho)=0$.

== Constraints from electromagnetic fields ==
Vacuum NEHs on which $\{\Phi_{ij}\hat{=}0\,,\Lambda_{}\hat{=}0\}$ are the simplest types of NEHs, but in general there can be various physically meaningful fields surrounding an NEH, among which we are mostly interested in electrovacuum fields with $\Lambda\hat{=}0$. This is the simplest extension of vacuum NEHs, and the nonvanishing energy-stress tensor for electromagnetic fields reads

$$(15)\qquad T_{ab}=\frac{1}{4\pi}\,\Big(\, F_{ac}F_b^c -\frac{1}{4}g_{ab}F_{cd}F^{cd} \Big)\,,$$

where $F_{ab}$ refers to the antisymmetric ($F_{ab}=-F_{ba}$, $F^a_a=0$) electromagnetic field strength, and $T_{ab}$ is trace-free ($T^a_a=0$) by definition and respects the dominant energy condition. (One should be careful with the antisymmetry of $F_{ab}$ in defining Maxwell-NP scalars $\phi_{i}$).

The boundary conditions derived in the previous section are applicable to generic NEHs. In the electromagnetic case, $\Phi_{ij}$ can be specified in a more particular way. By the NP formalism of Einstein-Maxwell equations, one has

$$(16)\qquad \Phi_{ij}=\, 2\, \phi_i\, \overline{\phi_j}\,,\quad i,j\in\{0,1,2\}\,,$$

where $\phi_i$ denote the three Maxwell-NP scalars. As an alternative to Eq(), we can see that the condition $\Phi_{00}=0$ also results from the NP equation

$$(17)\qquad D\rho -\bar{\delta}\kappa=(\rho^2+\sigma\bar{\sigma})+(\varepsilon+\bar{\varepsilon})\rho-\bar{\kappa}\tau-(3\alpha+\bar{\beta}-\pi)\,\kappa+\Phi_{00}\,\hat{=}\,0\,$$

as $\kappa_{}\,\hat{=}\,\rho\,\hat{=}\,\sigma=0$, so

$$(18)\qquad \Phi_{00}\,\hat{=}\,0\;\;\Leftrightarrow\;\;2\,\phi_{0}\,\overline{\phi_0}\,\hat{=}\,0\;\;\Rightarrow \;\;\phi_0=\overline{\phi_0}\,\hat{=}\,0\,.$$

It follows straightforwardly that

$$(19)\qquad \Phi_{01}=\overline{\Phi_{10}}=\,2\,\phi_0\,\overline{\phi_1}\,\hat{=}\,0\,,\quad
\Phi_{02}=\overline{\Phi_{20}}=\,2\,\phi_0\,\overline{\phi_2}\,\hat{=}\,0\,.$$

These results demonstrate that, there are no electromagnetic waves across ($\Phi_{00}$, $\Phi_{01}$) or along (\Phi_{02}) the NEH except the null geodesics generating the horizon. It is also worthwhile to point out that, the supplementary equation $\Phi_{ij}=2\,\phi_i\, \overline{\phi_j}$ in Eq() is only valid for electromagnetic fields; for example, in the case of Yang–Mills fields there will be $\Phi_{ij}=\,\text{Tr}\,\big(\,\digamma_i \,\bar{\digamma}_j \,\big)$ where $\digamma_i(i\in\{0,1,2 \}$ are Yang–Mills-NP scalars.

== Adapted tetrad on NEHs and further properties ==
Usually, null tetrads adapted to spacetime properties are employed to achieve the most succinct NP descriptions. For example, a null tetrad can be adapted to principal null directions once the Petrov type is known; also, at some typical boundary regions such as null infinity, timelike infinity, spacelike infinity, black hole horizons and cosmological horizons, tetrads can be adapted to boundary structures. Similarly, a preferred tetrad adapted to on-horizon geometric behaviors is employed in the literature to further investigate NEHs.

As indicated from the 3+1 perspective from condition (i) in the definition, an NEH ∆ is foliated by spacelike hypersurfaces ∆'=S^{2} transverse to its null normal along an ingoing null coordinate $v$, where we follow the standard notation of ingoing Eddington–Finkelstein null coordinates and use $v$ to label the 2-dimensional leaves $S^2_v$ at $v=\text{constant}$; that is, ${}\Delta={}\Delta'x[v_o,v_1]=S^2[v_o,v_1]$. $v$ is set to be future-directed and choose the first tetrad covector $n_a$ as $n_a=-dv$, and then there will be a unique vector field $l^a$ as null normals to $S^2_v$ satisfying the cross-normalization $l^an_a=-1$ and affine parametrization $Dv=1$; such choice of $\{l^a,n^a\}$ would actually yields a preferred foliation of ∆. While $\{l^a\,,n^a\}$ are related to the extrinsic properties and null generators (i.e. null flows/geodesic congruence on ∆), the remaining two complex null vectors $\{m^a,\bar{m}^a\}$ are to span the intrinsic geometry of a foliation leaf $S^2_v$, tangent to ∆ and transverse to $\{l^a\,,n^a\}$; that is, $\mathcal{L}_{\ell}m\,\hat{=}\,\mathcal{L}_{\ell}\bar{m}\hat{=}0$.

Now let's check the consequences of this kind of adapted tetrad. Since

$$(20)\qquad \mathcal{L}_{\ell}m=[\ell,m]\,\hat{=}\,0\;\Rightarrow\; \delta D-D\delta=(\bar{\alpha}+\beta-\bar{\pi})D+\kappa_{}\Delta-(\bar{\rho}+\varepsilon-\bar{\varepsilon})\delta-\sigma\bar{\delta} \,\hat{=}\,0 \,,$$

with $\kappa_{}\,\hat{=}\,\rho\,\hat{=}\,\sigma\,\hat{=}\,0$, we have

$$(21)\qquad \pi\,\hat{=}\,\alpha+\bar{\beta} \,,\quad  \varepsilon\,\hat{=}\,\bar{\varepsilon} \,.$$

Also, in such an adapted frame, the derivative $\mathcal{L}_{\bar{m}}m$ on ${}\Delta={}\Delta'x[v_o,v_1]=S^2[v_o,v_1]$ should be purely intrinsic; thus in the commutator

$$(22)\qquad \mathcal{L}_{\bar{m}}m=[\bar{m}, m]=\bar{\delta}\delta-\delta\bar{\delta}=
(\bar{\mu}-\mu)D+(\bar{\rho}-\rho)\Delta-(\bar{\beta}-\alpha)\delta-(\bar{\alpha}-\beta)\bar{\delta}\,,$$

the coefficients for the directional derivatives $D$ and ∆ must be zero, that is

$$(23)\qquad \bar{\mu}\,\hat{=}\,\mu  \,,\quad  \mathcal{L}_{\bar{m}}m
\,\hat{=}\,(\alpha-\bar{\beta})\delta-(\bar{\alpha}-\beta)\bar{\delta}\,,$$

so the ingoing null normal field $n^a$ is twist-free by $\text{Im}(\mu)=\text{Im}(\bar{m}^a m^b\nabla_b n_a)=0$, and $2\mu=2\text{Re}(\mu)$ equals the ingoing expansion rate $\theta_{(n)}$.

== Discussion ==
So far, the definition and boundary conditions of NEHs have been introduced. The boundary conditions include those for an arbitrary NEH, specific characteristics for Einstein-Maxwell (electromagnetic) NEHs, as well as further properties in an adapted tetrad. Based on NEHs, WIHs which have valid surface gravity can be defined to generalize the black hole mechanics. WIHs are sufficient in studying the physics on the horizon, but for geometric purposes, stronger restrictions can be imposed to WIHs so as to introduce IHs, where the equivalence class of null normals $[\ell]$ fully preserves the induced connection $\mathcal {D}$ on the horizon.
