= Dynamical horizon =

Local description of black hole horizons

In theoretical physics, a dynamical horizon (DH) is a local description (i.e. independent of the global structure of space–time) of evolving black-hole horizons. In the literature there exist two different mathematical formulations of DHs—the 2+2 formulation developed first by Sean Hayward and the 3+1 formulation developed by Abhay Ashtekar and others (see Ashtekar & Krishnan 2004). It provides a description of a black hole that is evolving (e.g. one that has a non-zero mass–energy influx). A related formalism, for black holes with zero influx, is an isolated horizon.

== Formal definition ==
The formal definition of a dynamical horizon is as follows:

A smooth, three-dimensional, space-like submanifold (possibly with boundary) Σ of space–time M is said to be a dynamical horizon if it can be foliated by a family of closed 2-manifolds such that on each leaf L

- the expansion Θ(ℓ) of one null normal ℓ is zero (i.e. it vanishes); and
- the expansion Θ(n) of the other null normal n is negative.

— Definition 3.3.2, Duggal & Şahin 2010, p. 118

== See also ==
- Isolated horizon
- Non-expanding horizon
