= Causal contact =

Sharing an event that affects entities in a causal way

Two entities are in causal contact if there may be an event that has affected both in a causal way. Every object of mass in space, for instance, exerts a field force on all other objects of mass, according to Newton's law of universal gravitation. Because this force exerted by one object affects the motion of the other, it can be said that these two objects are in causal contact.

The only objects not in causal contact are those for which there is no event in the history of the universe that could have sent a beam of light to both. For example, if the universe were not expanding and had existed for 10 billion years, anything more than 20 billion light-years away from the earth would not be in causal contact with it. Anything less than 20 billion light-years away would because an event occurring 10 billion years in the past that was 10 billion light-years away from both the earth and the object under question could have affected both. Depending on the expansion history of the universe, there may be a time such that there will be no particle horizons: all matter in the universe will be in causal contact.

A worldline through a light cone in 2D space plus a time dimension.

A good illustration of this principle is the light cone, which is constructed as follows. Taking as event $p$ a flash of light (light pulse) at time $t_0$, all events that can be reached by this pulse from $p$ form the future light cone of $p$, whilst those events that can send a light pulse to $p$ form the past light cone of $p$.

Given an event $E$, the light cone classifies all events in spacetime into 5 distinct categories:

- Events on the future light cone of $E$.
- Events on the past light cone of $E$.
- Events inside the future light cone of $E$ are those affected by the beam of light emitted at $E$.
- Events inside the past light cone of $E$ are those that can emit a beam of light and affect what is happening at $E$.
- All other events are in the (absolute) elsewhere of $E$ and are those that will never affect and can never be affected by $E$.

See the causal structure of Minkowski spacetime for a more detailed discussion.
