= Surface gravity =

Standard surface gravity

Astronaut John Young jumping on the Moon, illustrating that the gravitational pull of the Moon is approximately 1/6 of Earth's. The jumping height is limited by the EVA space suit's weight on the Moon of about 13.6 kg (30 lb) and by the suit's pressurization resisting the bending of the suit, as needed for jumping.

The surface gravity, g, of an astronomical object is the gravitational acceleration experienced at its surface at the equator, including the effects of rotation. Surface gravity may be understood as the acceleration due to gravity experienced by a hypothetical test particle located very close to the object's surface, which has negligible mass so as not to disturb the system. For objects where the surface lies deep within an atmosphere and the radius is not well defined, the surface gravity is given at the 1-bar pressure level in the atmosphere.

Surface gravity is measured in units of acceleration, which in the SI system are meters per second squared. It may also be expressed as a multiple of the Earth's standard surface gravity, which is equal to

g = 9.80665 m/s^{2}.

In astrophysics, the surface gravity may be expressed as $\log g$, which is obtained by first expressing the gravity in cgs units, where the unit of acceleration and surface gravity is centimeters per second squared (cm/s^{2}), and then taking the base-10 logarithm of the cgs value of the surface gravity. Therefore, the surface gravity of Earth could be expressed in cgs units as 980.665 cm/s^{2}, and then taking the base-10 logarithm ("log g") of 980.665, giving 2.992 as "log g".

The surface gravity of a white dwarf is very high, and that of a neutron star is even higher. A white dwarf's surface gravity is around 100,000 g (10^{6} m/s^{2}), while the compactness of a neutron star gives it a surface gravity of up to 7×10^{12} m/s^{2}, with typical values on the order of 10^{12} m/s^{2}. This is more than 10^{11} times that of Earth. One consequence of such immense gravity is that neutron stars have an escape velocity of around 100,000 km/s, about one-third of the speed of light. Since black holes do not have a surface, their surface gravity is not defined.

== Relationship of surface gravity to mass and radius ==
Surface gravity of various Solar System bodies (1 g = 9.80665 m/s^{2}, the average surface gravitational acceleration on Earth)
Name	Surface gravity
Sun	28.02 g
Mercury	0.377 g
Venus	0.905 g
Earth	1 g (midlatitudes)
Moon	0.165 7 g (average)
Mars	0.379 g (midlatitudes)
Phobos	0.000 581 g
Deimos	0.000 306 g
Pallas	0.022 g (equator)
Vesta	0.025 g (equator)
Ceres	0.029 g
Jupiter	2.528 g (midlatitudes)
Io	0.183 g
Europa	0.134 g
Ganymede	0.146 g
Callisto	0.126 g
Saturn	1.065 g (midlatitudes)
Mimas	0.006 48 g
Enceladus	0.011 5 g
Tethys	0.014 9 g
Dione	0.023 7 g
Rhea	0.026 9 g
Titan	0.138 g
Iapetus	0.022 8 g
Phoebe	0.003 9–0.005 1 g
Uranus	0.886 g (equator)
Miranda	0.007 9 g
Ariel	0.025 4 g
Umbriel	0.023 g
Titania	0.037 2 g
Oberon	0.036 1 g
Neptune	1.137 g (midlatitudes)
Proteus	0.007 g
Triton	0.079 4 g
Pluto	0.063 g
Charon	0.029 4 g
Eris	0.084 g
Haumea	0.0247 g (equator)
67P-CG	0.000 017 g

In the Newtonian theory of gravity, the gravitational force exerted by an object is proportional to its mass: an object with twice the mass produces twice as much force. Newtonian gravity also follows an inverse-square law, so that moving an object twice as far away divides its gravitational force by four, and moving it 10 times as far away divides it by 100. This is similar to the intensity of light, which also follows an inverse-square law: with relation to distance, light becomes less visible. Generally speaking, this can be understood as geometric dilution corresponding to point-source radiation into three-dimensional space.

A large object, such as a planet or star, is usually approximately round, approaching hydrostatic equilibrium (where all points on the surface have the same amount of gravitational potential energy). On a small scale, higher parts of the terrain are eroded, with eroded material deposited in lower parts of the terrain. On a large scale, the planet or star itself deforms until equilibrium is reached. For most celestial objects, the result is that the planet or star in question can be treated as a near-perfect sphere when the rotation rate is low. However, for young, massive stars, the equatorial azimuthal velocity can be quite high—up to 200 km/s or more—causing a significant amount of equatorial bulge. Examples of such rapidly rotating stars include Achernar, Altair, Regulus A and Vega.

The fact that many large celestial objects are approximately spheres makes it easier to calculate their surface gravity. According to the shell theorem, the gravitational force outside a spherically symmetric body is the same as if its entire mass were concentrated in the center, as was established by Sir Isaac Newton. Therefore, the surface gravity of a planet or star with a given mass is approximately inversely proportional to the square of its radius, and the surface gravity of a planet or star with a given average density is approximately proportional to its radius. For example, the recently discovered planet Gliese 581 c has at least 5 times the mass of Earth, but is unlikely to have 5 times its surface gravity. If its mass is no more than 5 times that of the Earth, as is expected, and if it is a rocky planet with a large iron core, it should have a radius approximately 50% larger than that of Earth. Gravity on such a planet's surface would be approximately 2.2 times as strong as on Earth. If it is an icy or watery planet, its radius might be as large as twice the Earth's, in which case its surface gravity might be no more than 1.25 times as strong as the Earth's.

These proportionalities may be expressed by the formula
$$g \propto \frac{m}{r^2},$$
where $g$ is the surface gravity of an object, expressed as a multiple of the Earth's, $m$ is its mass, expressed as a multiple of the Earth's mass (5.976×10^{24} kg), and $r$ its radius, expressed as a multiple of the Earth's (mean) radius (6,371 km). For instance, Mars has a mass of 6.4185×10^{23} kg = 0.107 Earth masses and a mean radius of 3,390 km = 0.532 Earth radii. The surface gravity of Mars is therefore approximately
$$\frac{0.107}{0.532^2} = 0.38$$
times that of Earth. Without using the Earth as a reference body, the surface gravity may also be calculated directly from Newton's law of universal gravitation, which gives the formula
$$g = \frac{GM}{r^2},$$
where $M$ is the mass of the object, $r$ is its radius, and $G$ is the gravitational constant. If $\rho = M/V$ denote the mean density of the object, this can also be written as
$$g = \frac{4\pi}{3} G \rho r,$$
so that, for fixed mean density, the surface gravity $g$ is proportional to the radius $r$. Solving for mass, this equation can be written as
$$g = G \left(\frac{4\pi\rho}{3}\right)^{2/3} M^{1/3}.$$
However, density is not constant but increases as the planet grows in size, as they are not incompressible bodies. That is why the experimental relationship between surface gravity and mass does not grow as 1/3 but as 1/2:
$$g \propto M^{1/2},$$
here with $g$ in times Earth's surface gravity and $M$ in times Earth's mass. In fact, the exoplanets found fulfilling the former relationship have been found to be rocky planets. Thus, for rocky planets, density grows with mass as $\rho \propto M^{1/4}.$

== Gas giants ==
For gas giant planets such as Jupiter, Saturn, Uranus, and Neptune, surface gravity is given at the 1-bar pressure level in the atmosphere. It has been found that for giant planets with masses up to 100 times that of Earth, surface gravity is nevertheless very similar and close to 1$g$, a region known as the gravity plateau.

== Non-spherically-symmetric objects ==
Most real astronomical objects are not perfectly spherically symmetric. One reason for this is that they are often rotating, which means that they are affected by the combined effects of gravitational force and centrifugal force. This causes stars and planets to be oblate, which means that their surface gravity is smaller at the equator than at the poles. This effect was exploited by Hal Clement in his SF novel Mission of Gravity, dealing with a massive, fast-spinning planet where gravity was much higher at the poles than at the equator.

To the extent that an object's internal distribution of mass differs from a symmetric model, the measured surface gravity may be used to deduce things about the object's internal structure. This fact has been put to practical use since 1915–1916, when Roland Eötvös's torsion balance was used to prospect for oil near the city of Egbell (now Gbely, Slovakia.) In 1924, the torsion balance was used to locate the Nash Dome oil fields in Texas.

It is sometimes useful to calculate the surface gravity of simple hypothetical objects which are not found in nature. The surface gravity of infinite planes, tubes, lines, hollow shells, cones, and even more unrealistic structures may be used to provide insights into the behavior of real structures.

== Black holes ==
In relativity, the Newtonian concept of acceleration turns out not to be clear cut. For a black hole, which must be treated relativistically, one cannot define a surface gravity as the acceleration experienced by a test body at the object's surface because there is no surface, although the event horizon is a natural alternative candidate, but this still presents a problem because the acceleration of a test body at the event horizon of a black hole turns out to be infinite in relativity. Because of this, a renormalized value is used that corresponds to the Newtonian value in the non-relativistic limit. The value used is generally the local proper acceleration (which diverges at the event horizon) multiplied by the gravitational time dilation factor (which goes to zero at the event horizon). For the Schwarzschild case, this value is mathematically well behaved for all non-zero values of $r$ and $M$.

When one talks about the surface gravity of a black hole, one is defining a notion that behaves analogously to the Newtonian surface gravity, but is not the same thing. In fact, the surface gravity of a general black hole is not well defined. However, one can define the surface gravity for a black hole whose event horizon is a Killing horizon.

The surface gravity $\kappa$ of a static Killing horizon is the acceleration, as exerted at infinity, needed to keep an object at the horizon. Mathematically, if $k^a$ is a suitably normalized Killing vector, then the surface gravity is defined by
$$k^a \,\nabla_a k^b = \kappa k^b,$$
where the equation is evaluated at the horizon. For a static and asymptotically flat spacetime, the normalization should be chosen so that $k^a k_a \to -1$ as $r \to \infty$, and so that $\kappa \geq 0$. For the Schwarzschild solution, take $k^a$ to be the time translation Killing vector $k^a \partial_a = \frac \partial {\partial t}$, and more generally for the Kerr–Newman solution take $k^a\partial_a = \frac{\partial}{\partial t} + \Omega \frac{\partial}{\partial\varphi}$, the linear combination of the time translation and axisymmetry Killing vectors which is null at the horizon, where $\Omega$ is the angular velocity.

=== Schwarzschild solution ===
Since $k^a$ is a Killing vector $k^a \,\nabla_a k^b = \kappa k^b$ implies $-k^a \,\nabla^b k_a = \kappa k^b$. In $(t,r,\theta,\varphi)$ coordinates $k^a=(1,0,0,0)$. Performing a coordinate change to the advanced Eddington–Finklestein coordinates $v = t + r + 2M \ln |r-2M|$ causes the metric to take the form
$$ds^2 = -\left(1-\frac{2M} r \right)\,dv^2+ \left(dv\,dr + \,dr\,dv\right) +r^2 \left(d\theta^2+\sin^2\theta\, d\varphi^2\right).$$

Under a general change of coordinates the Killing vector transforms as $k^v = A_t^v k^t$ giving the vectors $k^{a'} = \delta^{a'}_{v} =(1,0,0,0)$ and $k_{a'} = g_{a'v} = \left(-1+\frac{2M} r ,1,0,0\right).$

Considering the $b=v$ entry for $k^a \,\nabla_a k^b = \kappa k^b$ gives the differential equation $-\frac 1 2 \frac \partial {\partial r} \left( -1+\frac{2M} r \right) = \kappa.$

Therefore, the surface gravity for the Schwarzschild solution with mass $M$ is $\kappa = \frac 1 {4M}$ ($\kappa = {c^4} / {4GM}$ in SI units).

=== Kerr metric ===
The surface gravity for the uncharged, rotating black hole is, simply
$$\kappa = g - k ,$$
where $g = \frac 1 {4M}$ is the Schwarzschild surface gravity, and $k := M \Omega_+^2$ is the spring constant of the rotating black hole. $\Omega_+$ is the angular velocity at the event horizon. This expression gives a simple Hawking temperature of $2\pi T = g - k$.

=== Kerr–Newman metric ===
The surface gravity for the Kerr–Newman metric is
$$\kappa = \frac{r_+ - r_-}{2\left(r_+^2 + a^2\right)} = \frac{\sqrt{M^2 - Q^2 - J^2/M^2}}{2M^2 - Q^2 + 2M \sqrt{M^2 - Q^2 - J^2/M^2}},$$
where $Q$ is the electric charge, $J$ is the angular momentum, define $r_\pm := M \pm \sqrt{M^2 - Q^2 - J^2/M^2}$ to be the locations of the two horizons and $a := J/M$.
