= Cosmological horizon =

Horizon appearing on a cosmological scale

A cosmological horizon is one of two boundaries in three dimensional space, the particle horizon or the event horizon. The particle horizon divides space into points from which light has had enough time to reach an observer, and points that are too distant for their light to have reached the observer. The particle horizon is the boundary of the observable universe. The event horizon includes all possible future observations: points outside the event horizon can never be observed. The event horizon is the boundary of all future observable universes. These boundaries are a consequence of general relativity, the expanding universe, and the physics of Big Bang cosmology.

== Particle horizon ==
The particle horizon, also called the comoving particle horizon, is the maximum distance from which light from particles could have traveled to the observer in the age of the universe. It represents the boundary between the observable and the unobservable regions of the universe, so its distance at the present epoch defines the size of the observable universe. When cosmologists say "horizon" they almost always mean the particle horizon.

In an empty, homogeneous, and isotropic universe the proper distance to the horizon at time t is
$$d_H(t) = R(t) \int_0^t \frac{dt'}{R(t')}$$
where R is the cosmological scale factor with dimensions of length.

In terms of comoving distance, the particle horizon is equal to the conformal time that has passed since the Big Bang, times the speed of light. In general, the conformal time at a certain time is given in terms of the normalized scale factor $a = R(t)/R(t=0)$ by,
$$\eta(t) = \int_{0}^{t} \frac{dt'}{a(t')}$$

The particle horizon is the boundary between two regions at a point at a given time: one region defined by events that have already been observed by an observer, and the other by events which cannot be observed at that time. It represents the furthest distance from which we can retrieve information from the past, and so defines the observable universe.

== Event horizon ==
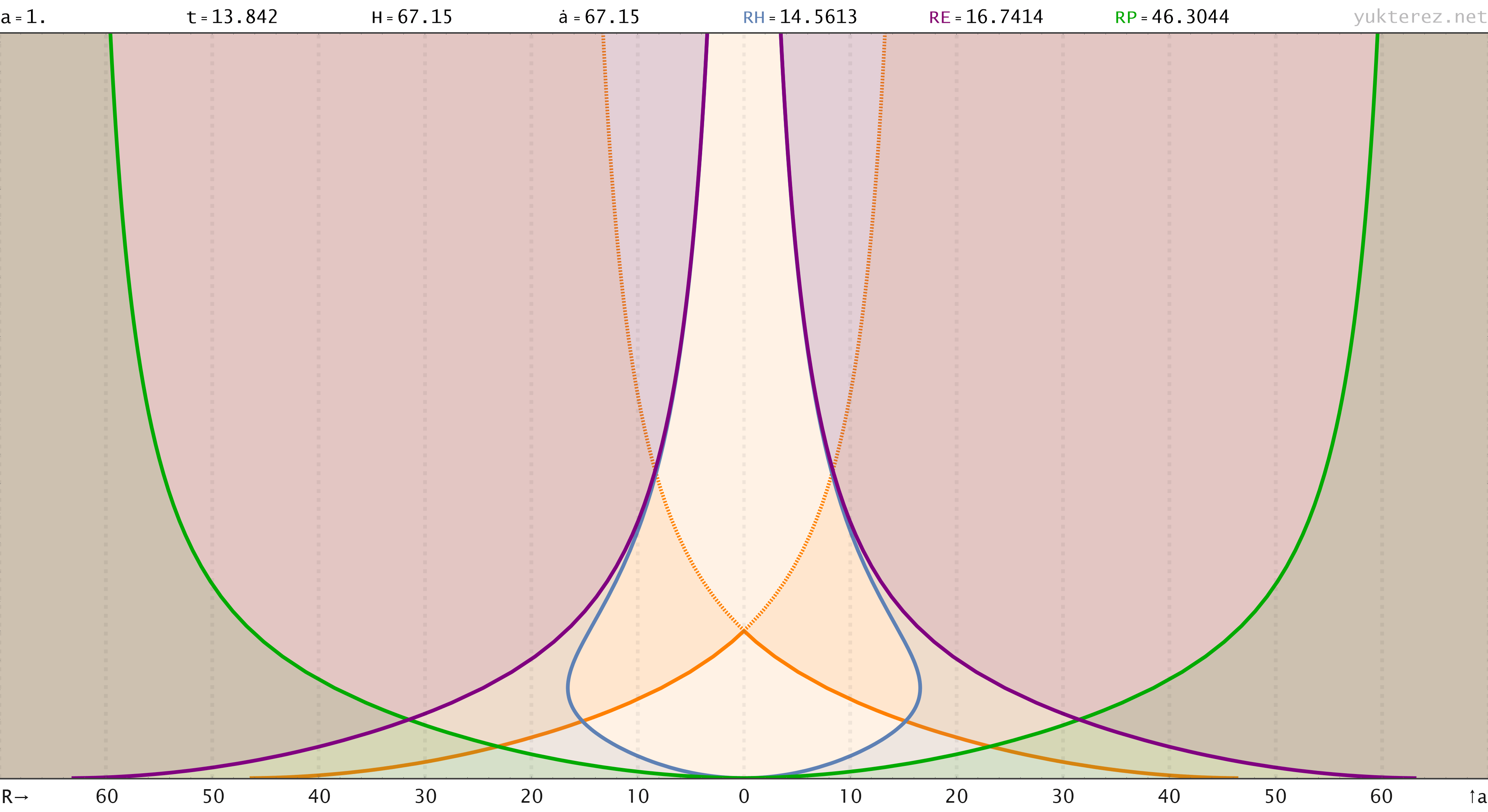
The evolution of the universe and its horizons in comoving distances. The x-axis is distance, in billions of light years; the y-axis is time, in billions of years since the Big Bang. This model of the universe includes dark energy which causes an accelerating expansion after a certain point in time, and results in an event horizon beyond which we can never see.

The particle horizon differs from the cosmic event horizon, in that the particle horizon represents the largest comoving distance from which light could have reached the observer by a specific time, while the cosmic event horizon is the largest comoving distance from which light emitted now can ever reach the observer in the future. The current distance to our cosmic event horizon is about five gigaparsecs (16 billion light-years), well within our observable range given by the particle horizon.

In general, the proper distance to the event horizon at time $t$ is given by
$$d_e(t) = a(t) \int_{t}^{t_{\text{max}}} \frac{cdt'}{a(t')}$$
where $t_\text{max}$ is the time-coordinate of the end of the universe, which would be infinite in the case of a universe that expands forever.

For our case, assuming that dark energy is due to a cosmological constant Λ, there will be a minimum Hubble parameter H_{e} and a maximum horizon d_{e} which is often referred to as the only particle horizon:
$$\max(d_e) = \frac{c}{H_e} = c\sqrt{\frac{3}{\Lambda}} = \frac{c}{\sqrt{\Omega_\Lambda} H_0} = 17.55\ \textrm{Gly}.$$

== Future horizon ==
The current concordance or Lambda-CDM model of cosmology is based on an accelerating universe. Extrapolating the model into the far future predicts a universe consisting solely of our Milky Way. Light from distant galaxies will be redshifted so much as to become invisible. Thus observational evidence for cosmology, including the particle horizon, will be unverifiable.

== Other horizons ==
While not technically "horizons" in the sense of an impossibility for observations due to relativity or cosmological solutions, there are practical horizons which include the optical horizon, set at the surface of last scattering. This is the farthest distance that any photon can freely stream. The Hubble sphere is also called the "photon horizon". Similarly, there is a "neutrino horizon" set for the farthest distance a neutrino can freely stream and a gravitational wave horizon at the farthest distance that gravitational waves can freely stream. The latter is predicted to be a direct probe of the end of cosmic inflation.

== History ==
The nature of cosmological horizons was clarified by Wolfgang Rindler in 1956. He distinguished instantaneous events like a supernova from world lines, a string of events like light from a durable object like galaxy. The behavior of world lines became the basis for splitting the observable and unobservable universe.

== See also ==
- Killing horizon
