= Null hypersurface =

Type of hypersurface

In relativity and in pseudo-Riemannian geometry, a null hypersurface is a hypersurface whose normal vector at every point is a null vector (has zero length with respect to the local metric tensor). A light cone is an example.

An alternative characterization is that the tangent space at every point of a hypersurface contains a nonzero vector such that the metric applied to such a vector and any vector in the tangent space is zero. Another way of saying this is that the pullback of the metric onto the tangent space is degenerate.

For a Lorentzian metric, all the vectors in such a tangent space are space-like except in one direction, in which they are null. Physically, there is exactly one lightlike worldline contained in a null hypersurface through each point that corresponds to the worldline of a particle moving at the speed of light, and no contained worldlines that are time-like. Examples of null hypersurfaces include a light cone, a Killing horizon, a Cauchy horizon, and the event horizon of a black hole.
