= Particle horizon =

Distance measurement used in cosmology

The particle horizon (also called the cosmological horizon, the comoving horizon, or the cosmic light horizon) is the maximum distance from which light from particles could have traveled to the observer in the age of the universe. Much like the concept of a terrestrial horizon, it represents the boundary between the observable and the unobservable regions of the universe, so its distance at the present epoch defines the size of the observable universe. Due to the expansion of the universe, it is not simply the age of the universe times the speed of light (approximately 13.8 billion light-years), but rather the speed of light times the conformal time. The existence, properties, and significance of a cosmological horizon depend on the particular cosmological model.

== Kinematic model ==
The particle horizon is a distance in a comoving coordinate system, a system that has the expansion of the universe built in. The expansion is defined by a (dimensionless) scale factor $a(t)$ set to have a value of one today. The time that light takes to travel a distance dx in the comoving coordinate system will be $dx=dt/a(t)$ in units of light years ($c=1$). The total distance light can travel in the time t since the Big Bang at $t=0$ sums all the incremental distances:

$$\eta = \int_{0}^{t} \frac{dt'}{a(t')}$$

The comoving horizon $\eta$ increases monotonically and thus can be used a time parameter: the particle horizon is equal to the conformal time $\eta$ that has passed since the Big Bang, times the speed of light $c$.

By convention, a subscript 0 indicates "today" so that the conformal time today $\eta(t_0) = \eta_0 = 1.48 \times 10^{18}\text{ s}$. Note that the conformal time is not the age of the universe as generally understood. That age refers instead to a time as defined by the Robertson-Walker form of the cosmological metric, which time is presumed to be measured by a traditional clock and estimated to be around $4.35 \times 10^{17}\text{ s}$. By contrast $\eta_0$ is the age of the universe as measured by a Marzke-Wheeler "light clock".

The particle horizon recedes constantly as time passes and the conformal time grows. As such, the observed size of the universe always increases. Since proper distance at a given time is just comoving distance times the scale factor (with comoving distance normally defined to be equal to proper distance at the present time, so $a(t_0) = 1$ at present), the proper distance, $d_p(t),$ to the particle horizon at time $t$ is given by

$$d_p(t) = a(t) \int_{0}^{t} \frac{c\,dt'}{a(t')}$$

The value of the distance to the horizon depends on details in $a(t)$.

== Evolution of the particle horizon ==
In this section we consider the FLRW cosmological model. In that context, the universe can be approximated as composed by non-interacting constituents, each one being a perfect fluid with density $\rho_i$, partial pressure $p_i$ and state equation $p_i=\omega_i \rho_i$, such that they add up to the total density $\rho$ and total pressure $p$. Let us now define the following functions:

- Hubble function $H=\frac{\dot a}{a}$
- The critical density $\rho_c=\frac{3}{8\pi G}H^2$
- The i-th dimensionless energy density $\Omega_i=\frac{\rho_i}{\rho_c}$
- The dimensionless energy density $\Omega=\frac \rho {\rho_c}=\sum \Omega_i$
- The redshift $z$ given by the formula $1+z=\frac{a_0}{a(t)}$

Any function with a zero subscript denote the function evaluated at the present time $t_0$ (or equivalently $z=0$). The last term can be taken to be $1$ including the curvature state equation. It can be proved that the Hubble function is given by

$$H(z)=H_0\sqrt{\sum \Omega_{i0}(1+z)^{n_i}}$$

where the dilution exponent $n_i=3(1+\omega_i)$. Notice that the addition ranges over all possible partial constituents and in particular there can be countably infinitely many. With this notation we have:

$$\text{The particle horizon } d_p \text{ exists if and only if } N>2$$

where $N$ is the largest $n_i$ (possibly infinite). The evolution of the particle horizon for an expanding universe ($\dot{a}>0$) is:

$$\frac{d}{dt}d_p=d_p(z)H(z)+c$$

where $c$ is the speed of light and can be taken to be $1$ (natural units). Notice that the derivative is made with respect to the FLRW-time $t$, while the functions are evaluated at the redshift $z$ which are related as stated before. We have an analogous but slightly different result for event horizon.

== Horizon problem ==
The concept of a particle horizon can be used to illustrate the horizon problem, which is an unresolved issue associated with the Big Bang model. Extrapolating back to the time of recombination when the cosmic microwave background (CMB) was emitted, we obtain a particle horizon of about

$$H_p(t_\text{CMB}) = c\eta_\text{CMB} = 284\text{ Mpc} = 8.9 \times 10^{-3} H_p(t_0)$$

which corresponds to a proper size at that time of:

$$a_\text{CMB}H_p(t_\text{CMB}) = 261\text{ kpc}$$

Since we observe the CMB to be emitted essentially from our particle horizon ($284\text{ Mpc} \ll 14.4\text{ Gpc}$), our expectation is that parts of the cosmic microwave background (CMB) that are separated by about a fraction of a great circle across the sky of

$$f = \frac{H_p(t_\text{CMB})}{H_p(t_0)}$$

(an angular size of $\theta \sim 1.7^\circ$) should be out of causal contact with each other. That the entire CMB is in thermal equilibrium and approximates a blackbody so well is therefore not explained by the standard explanations about the way the expansion of the universe proceeds. The most popular resolution to this problem is cosmic inflation.

== See also ==
- Cosmological horizon
- Observable universe
