= Killing horizon =

Geometrical construct in general relativity

In physics, a Killing horizon is a geometrical construct used in general relativity and its generalizations to delineate spacetime boundaries without reference to the dynamic Einstein field equations. Mathematically a Killing horizon is a null hypersurface defined by the vanishing of the norm of a Killing vector field (both are named after Wilhelm Killing). It can also be defined as a null hypersurface generated by a Killing vector, which in turn is null at that surface.

After Hawking showed that quantum field theory in curved spacetime (without reference to the Einstein field equations) predicted that a black hole formed by collapse will emit thermal radiation, it became clear that there is an unexpected connection between spacetime geometry (Killing horizons) and thermal effects for quantum fields. In particular, there is a very general relationship between thermal radiation and spacetimes that admit a one-parameter group of isometries possessing a bifurcate Killing horizon, which consists of a pair of intersecting null hypersurfaces that are orthogonal to the Killing field.

== Flat spacetime ==
In Minkowski space-time, in pseudo-Cartesian coordinates $(t,x,y,z)$ with signature $(+,-,-,-),$ an example of Killing horizon is provided by the Lorentz boost (a Killing vector of the space-time)

$$V = x \, \partial_t + t \, \partial_x.$$

The square of the norm of $V$ is

$$g(V,V)=x^2-t^2=(x+t)(x-t).$$

Therefore, $V$ is null only on the hyperplanes of equations

$$x+t=0, \text{ and } x-t=0,$$

that, taken together, are the Killing horizons generated by $V$.

== Black hole Killing horizons ==
Exact black hole metrics such as the Kerr–Newman metric contain Killing horizons, which can coincide with their ergospheres. For this spacetime, the corresponding Killing horizon is located at

$$r = r_e := M + \sqrt{M^2 - Q^2 - a^2 \cos^2 \theta}.$$

In the usual coordinates, outside the Killing horizon, the Killing vector field $\partial / \partial t$ is timelike, whilst inside it is spacelike.

Furthermore, considering a particular linear combination of $\partial / \partial t$ and $\partial / \partial \phi$, both of which are Killing vector fields, gives rise to a Killing horizon that coincides with the event horizon.

Associated with a Killing horizon is a geometrical quantity known as surface gravity, $\kappa$. If the surface gravity vanishes, then the Killing horizon is said to be degenerate.

The temperature of Hawking radiation, found by applying quantum field theory in curved spacetime to black holes, is related to the surface gravity $c^2\kappa$ by $T_H = \frac{\hbar c\kappa}{2 \pi k_B}$ with $k_B$ the Boltzmann constant and $\hbar$ the reduced Planck constant.

== Cosmological Killing horizons ==
De Sitter space has a Killing horizon at $r = \sqrt{3 / \Lambda}$, which emits thermal radiation at temperature $T = \frac 1 {2 \pi} \sqrt{\frac{1}{3}\Lambda}$.

== Further details ==
The term "Killing horizon" originates from the Killing vector field, a concept in differential geometry. A Killing vector field, in a given spacetime, is a vector field that preserves the metric.

In the context of black holes, a Killing horizon is often associated with the event horizon. However, they are not always the same. For instance, in a rotating black hole (a Kerr black hole), the event horizon and the Killing horizon do not coincide.

The concept of a Killing horizon is significant in the study of Hawking radiation. This is a theoretical prediction that black holes should emit radiation due to quantum effects near the event horizon.

The Killing horizon also plays a role in the study of cosmic censorship hypotheses, which propose that singularities (points where quantities become infinite) are always hidden inside black holes, and thus cannot be observed from the rest of the Universe.
