= Index of physics articles (D) =

The index of physics articles is split into multiple pages due to its size.

To navigate by individual letter use the table of contents below.

== D ==
- D band (NATO)
- D band (waveguide)
- D'Alembert's paradox
- D'Alembert's principle
- D'Alembert force
- D'Alembert–Euler condition
- D-brane
- D-term
- D. Van Holliday
- D0 experiment
- DAFNE
- DAMA/LIBRA
- DAMA/NaI
- DBrn
- DCOMP
- DEAP
- DEEP2 Redshift Survey
- DELPHI experiment
- DESY
- DGLAP
- DGP model
- DIDO (nuclear reactor)
- DIII-D (tokamak)
- DNA condensation
- DNG metamaterial
- DONUT
- DUMAND Project
- D meson
- Daan Frenkel
- Dai Chuanzeng
- Dale A. Anderson
- Dalitz plot
- Dallas Abbott
- Dalton's law
- Daly detector
- Damping ratio
- Damping matrix
- Damping torque
- Dan Danknick
- Dan Jacobo Beninson
- Dan McKenzie (geophysicist)
- Dan Shechtman
- Danah Zohar
- Dangerously irrelevant operator
- Dangling bond
- Daniel Bernoulli
- Daniel C. Tsui
- Daniel Chonghan Hong
- Daniel D. Joseph
- Daniel Frank Walls
- Daniel Friedan
- Daniel Frost Comstock
- Daniel Gabriel Fahrenheit
- Daniel Gillespie
- Daniel Gottesman
- Daniel Gralath
- Daniel Isaachsen (physicist)
- Daniel Joseph Bradley
- Daniel Kastler
- Daniel Kleppner
- Daniel L. Stein
- Daniel Lidar
- Daniel Loss
- Daniel Webster Hering
- Daniel Z. Freedman
- Daniel Zajfman
- Dannie Heineman Prize for Mathematical Physics
- Daraf
- Darcy's law
- Darcy friction factor formulae
- Darcy–Weisbach equation
- Daresbury Laboratory
- Dark-energy-dominated era
- Dark-energy star
- DarkSide (dark matter experiment)
- Dark current (physics)
- Dark energy
- Dark flow
- Dark fluid
- Dark galaxy
- Dark matter
- Dark optical trap
- Dark radiation
- Dark star (Newtonian mechanics)
- Dark star (dark matter)
- Dark state
- Dart leader
- Darwin–Radau equation
- Darwin drift
- Dasar
- Data acquisition
- Data analysis
- Daulat Singh Kothari
- Dave Green (astrophysicist)
- Dave Thomas (physicist)
- Davey–Stewartson equation
- David A. Frank-Kamenetskii
- David A. Weitz
- David Adler (physicist)
- David Adler Lectureship Award in the Field of Materials Physics
- David Allan Bromley
- David Alter
- David Avison
- David Awschalom
- David B. Kaplan
- David B. Malament
- David Bates (physicist)
- David Berenstein
- David Blair (physicist)
- David Bohm
- David Brewster
- David Carroll (physicist)
- David Ceperley
- David Chandler (chemist)
- David Chapman (scientist)
- David Cockayne
- David Cohen (physicist)
- David Crighton
- David Delano Clark
- David Deming
- David Deutsch
- David Douglass
- David Dunlap Observatory
- David E. Aspnes
- David E. Goldman
- David E. Kaplan (physicist)
- David E. Pritchard
- David Enskog
- David Evans (mathematician)
- David Faiman
- David Field (astrophysicist)
- David Finkelstein
- David Flower
- David Goodstein
- David Griffiths (physicist)
- David Gross
- David H. Frisch
- David H. Lyth
- David H. Munro
- David Halliday (physicist)
- David C. Hanna
- David Hestenes
- David Hilbert
- David J. Brenner
- David J. C. MacKay
- David J. Lockwood
- David J. Smith (physicist)
- David J. Thouless
- David Jaffray
- David John Candlin
- David K. Ferry
- David Kaiser (physicist)
- David Keynes Hill
- David Klyshko
- David L. Fried
- David L. Webster
- David Lee (physicist)
- David Lindley (physicist)
- David M. Dennison
- David McNiven Garner
- David Medved
- David Mermin
- David Mervyn Blow
- David N. Payne
- David Norman (ornithologist)
- David Olive
- David P. Landau
- David Parry (biophysicist)
- David Pegg (physicist)
- David Pines
- David R. Nygren
- David Reitze
- David Robert Nelson
- David Ruelle
- David S. Cafiso
- David Saltzberg
- David Schramm (astrophysicist)
- David Shoenberg
- David Spergel
- David States
- David Strangway
- David Tabor
- David Todd Wilkinson
- David Vanderbilt
- David W. Turner
- David Wallace (physicist)
- David Wands
- David Willey (physicist)
- David William Dye
- Davidson correction
- Davisson–Germer Prize in Atomic or Surface Physics
- Davisson–Germer experiment
- Davydov soliton
- Dawes' limit
- Dawn chorus (electromagnetic)
- Day length
- Daya Bay Reactor Neutrino Experiment
- Daylight
- Daylight factor
- Dayton Miller
- Dbx (noise reduction)
- DeWitt Bristol Brace
- DeWitt notation
- De Broglie–Bohm theory
- De Bruijn graph
- De Haas–van Alphen effect
- De Laval nozzle
- De Magnete
- De Sitter double star experiment
- De Sitter invariant special relativity
- De Sitter precession
- De Sitter space
- De Sitter universe
- De Sitter–Schwarzschild metric
- De motu corporum in gyrum
- De revolutionibus orbium coelestium
- Dead time
- Dean number
- Deane B. Judd
- Death by Black Hole: And Other Cosmic Quandaries
- Debendra Mohan Bose
- Deborah S. Jin
- Deborah number
- Debra Searles
- Debye frequency
- Debye model
- Debye relaxation
- Debye sheath
- Debye–Falkenhagen effect
- Debye–Waller factor
- Decay chain
- Decay energy
- Decay heat
- Decay product
- Deceleration parameter
- Decibel
- Decollimation
- Deconfinement
- Decorrelation
- Decoy state
- Deep-dose equivalent
- Deep-level transient spectroscopy
- Deep-level trap
- Deep Impact (spacecraft)
- Deep Underground Science and Engineering Laboratory
- Deep inelastic scattering
- Defining equation (physical chemistry)
- Deflected slipstream
- Deflection (physics)
- Defocus aberration
- Deformable body
- Deformation (engineering)
- Deformation (mechanics)
- Degasification
- Degasperis–Procesi equation
- Degaussing
- Degenerate energy levels
- Degenerate matter
- Degenerate orbital
- Degree of coherence
- Degree of ionization
- Degrees of freedom (physics and chemistry)
- Dehydron
- Dejan Milošević
- Delaunay tessellation field estimator
- Delayed choice quantum eraser
- Delayed nuclear radiation
- Delocalized electron
- Delta-v
- Delta-v (physics)
- Delta-v budget
- Delta baryon
- Delta potential
- Delta ray
- Delta wing
- Demagnetizing field
- Dember effect
- Demetrios Christodoulou
- Demetrius Hondros
- Democratic principle
- Denaturation (fissile materials)
- Dendrite (metal)
- Deng Jiaxian
- Denge
- Denis Evans
- Denis Papin
- Denis Rousseau
- Denis Weaire
- Dennis Dieks
- Dennis Gabor
- Dennis William Sciama
- Dense plasma focus
- Densitometry
- Density
- Density functional theory
- Density matrix
- Density matrix renormalization group
- Density of air
- Density of states
- Density wave theory
- Denys Wilkinson
- Denys Wilkinson Building
- Department of Applied Science, UC Davis
- Department of Atomic Energy (India)
- Departure function
- Dephasing
- Depolarization ratio
- Deposition (aerosol physics)
- Deposition (phase transition)
- Depression storage capacity
- Depth of field
- Depth–slope product
- Derecho
- Derek Abbott
- Derek Barton
- Derivation of the Navier–Stokes equations
- Deriving the Schwarzschild solution
- Desert (particle physics)
- Desmond King-Hele
- Desorption
- Detached eddy simulation
- Detailed balance
- Detection of internally reflected Cherenkov light
- Determinism
- Deterministic system
- Detlef Quadfasel
- Detlev Buchholz
- Deuterium
- Deuterium-depleted water
- Deuterium burning
- Deutsche Physik
- Deutsche Physikalische Gesellschaft
- Deutsch–Jozsa algorithm
- Dew
- Dew point
- Dew point depression
- Dewbow
- Dewetting
- Dexter electron transfer
- Dextrorotation and levorotation
- Di-positronium
- Diabatic representation
- Dialogue Concerning the Two Chief World Systems
- Dialysis tubing
- Dialyt lens
- Dialyte lens
- Diamagnetism
- Diamond Light Source
- Diamond anvil cell
- Diamond cubic
- Diamond dust
- Diamond knife
- Diaphragm (acoustics)
- Diaphragm (mechanical device)
- Diatomic carbon
- Dibaryon
- Dichroic filter
- Dichroism
- Dichromatism
- Dick Teresi
- Diederik Korteweg
- Dielectric
- Dielectric barrier discharge
- Dielectric breakdown model
- Dielectric complex reluctance
- Dielectric dispersion
- Dielectric heating
- Dielectric mirror
- Dielectric relaxation
- Dielectric reluctance
- Dielectric spectroscopy
- Dielectric strength
- Dielectric wall accelerator
- Dielectrophoresis
- Diesel cycle
- Dieter Langbein
- Dieter Lüst
- Dieter Matthaei
- Dieter Weichert
- Dietrich Küchemann
- Diffeomorphism constraint
- Difference density map
- Differential entropy
- Differential rotation
- Differential scanning calorimetry
- Differential stress
- Diffraction
- Diffraction-limited system
- Diffraction grating
- Diffraction standard
- Diffraction tomography
- Diffuse Infrared Background Experiment
- Diffuse element method
- Diffuse reflection
- Diffuse sky radiation
- Diffuser (optics)
- Diffusing-wave spectroscopy
- Diffusion
- Diffusion (acoustics)
- Diffusion current
- Diffusion damping
- Diffusion equation
- Diffuson
- Digital holographic microscopy
- Digital magnetofluidics
- Digital physics
- Digital room correction
- Dihedral (aircraft)
- Dilatant
- Dilaton
- Dilution of precision (GPS)
- Dimensional analysis
- Dimensional deconstruction
- Dimensional reduction
- Dimensional regularization
- Dimensional transmutation
- Dimensionless Hubble parameter
- Dimensionless physical constant
- Dimensionless quantity
- Dimitri Nanopoulos
- Dimitri Riabouchinsky
- Dineutron
- Diocotron instability
- Diode
- Diode-pumped solid-state laser
- Dioptric correction
- Dioptrics
- Dip circle
- Dipan Ghosh
- Dipankar Home
- Dipleidoscope
- Dipolar
- Dipolar polarization
- Dipole
- Dipole (disambiguation)
- Dipole anisotropy
- Dipole magnet
- Dipole model of the Earth's magnetic field
- Dipole–dipole attraction
- Diproton
- Diquark
- Dirac Prize
- Dirac adjoint
- Dirac delta function
- Dirac equation
- Dirac equation in the algebra of physical space
- Dirac fermion
- Dirac large numbers hypothesis
- Dirac operator
- Dirac sea
- Dirac spinor
- Dirac string
- Direct-current discharge
- Direct and indirect band gaps
- Direct laser lithography
- Direct laser writing
- Direct numerical simulation
- Direct quantum chemistry
- Directed-energy weapon
- Directed percolation
- Directional-hemispherical reflectance
- Directional Recoil Identification From Tracks
- Directional sound
- Directional stability
- Directivity
- Dirichlet problem
- Dirk Bouwmeester
- Dirk Brockmann
- Dirk Coster
- Dirk Kreimer
- Dirk Polder
- Dirk Reuyl
- Dirk ter Haar
- Disc permeameter
- Discharge pressure
- Discotic liquid crystal
- Discoveries of extrasolar planets
- Discovery of cosmic microwave background radiation
- Discrete Lorentzian quantum gravity
- Discrete dipole approximation
- Discrete dipole approximation codes
- Discrete element method
- Discrete optimized protein energy
- Discrete spectrum (physics)
- Discrete symmetry
- Disgregation
- Disorder operator
- Dispersion-shifted fiber
- Dispersion (optics)
- Dispersion (physics)
- Dispersion (radiation)
- Dispersion (water waves)
- Dispersion relation
- Dispersive mass transfer
- Dispersive prism
- Displacement (fluid)
- Displacement (vector)
- Displacement current
- Displacement field (mechanics)
- Displacement operator
- Displacement thickness
- Displayed average noise level
- Disruptive discharge
- Dissipation
- Dissipation factor
- Dissipative particle dynamics
- Dissipative system
- Dissociative recombination
- Dissymmetry of lift
- Distance measures (cosmology)
- Distance modulus
- Distortion (optics)
- Distortion free energy density
- Distributed Bragg reflector
- Distributed acoustic sensing
- Distributed feedback laser
- Distribution function
- Divergence
- Divergence theorem
- Divertor
- Dmitri Ivanenko
- Dmitri Skobeltsyn
- Dmitri Z. Garbuzov
- Dmitry Dmitrievich Maksutov
- Dmitry Nalivkin
- Dmitry Shirkov
- Dmitry Zubarev
- Dmrg of Heisenberg model
- Does God Play Dice? The New Mathematics of Chaos
- Dogan Abukay
- Domain theory of ferromagnetism
- Domain wall (magnetism)
- Domain wall (optics)
- Domain wall (string theory)
- Domenico Pacini
- Dominique Lorentz
- Don Hendrix
- Don Kirkham
- Don L. Anderson
- Don Misener
- Donald A. Glaser
- Donald Braben
- Donald Cooksey
- Donald Ginsberg
- Donald H. Weingarten
- Donald Hill Perkins
- Donald J. Hughes
- Donald Keck
- Donald Lynden-Bell
- Donald MacCrimmon MacKay
- Donald Marolf
- Donald N. Langenberg
- Donald R. F. Harleman
- Donald R. Herriott
- Donald William Kerst
- Donor (semiconductors)
- Donor impurity
- Dopant
- Doping (semiconductor)
- Doppler broadening
- Doppler cooling
- Doppler cooling limit
- Doppler effect
- Doppler spectroscopy
- Dopplergraph
- Dorothy Nickerson
- Dorte Juul Jensen
- Dose fractionation
- Dose-fractionation theorem
- Dosimeter
- Dosimetry
- Double-exchange mechanism
- Double-slit experiment
- Double Chooz
- Double beta decay
- Double diffusive convection
- Double electron capture
- Double inverted pendulum
- Double ionization
- Double negative metamaterial
- Double negative metamaterials
- Double pendulum
- Doublet (lens)
- Doublet state
- Doublet–triplet splitting problem
- Doubly ionized oxygen
- Doubly special relativity
- Doughnut theory of the universe
- Douglas Hartree
- Douglas Osheroff
- Douglas P. Verret
- Douglas Ross (physicist)
- Douglas Sea Scale
- Douglas Warrick
- Down quark
- Downburst
- Downforce
- Downhill folding
- Downton pump
- Downwash
- Drag-resistant aerospike
- Drag (fluid mechanics)
- Drag (physics)
- Drag Polar
- Drag coefficient
- Drag count
- Drag crisis
- Drag divergence Mach number
- Drag equation
- Dragon reactor
- Draupner wave
- Drell–Yan process
- Drift (plasma physics)
- Drift current
- Drift velocity
- Drinking bird
- Driven oscillations
- Drop (liquid)
- Drude model
- Drummond Matthews
- Dry-bulb temperature
- Dry ice
- Du Noüy ring method
- Du Qinghua
- Dual lattice
- Dual polarization interferometry
- Dual resonance model
- Dual superconductor model
- Dual tensor
- Duality (electricity and magnetism)
- Duane H. Cooper
- Duane–Hunt law
- Ducted propeller
- Ductility
- Dudley Williams (physicist)
- Duhamel's integral
- Duhem–Margules equation
- Dulong–Petit law
- Dumb hole
- Duncan Haldane
- Duncan J. Watts
- Duncan T. Moore
- Duoplasmatron
- Durmus A. Demir
- Duru–Kleinert transformation
- Dust (relativity)
- Dust devil
- Dust solution
- Dusty plasma
- Dutch roll
- Dwarf galaxy problem
- Dwarf planet
- Dyadics
- Dye-sensitized solar cell
- Dye laser
- Dynameter
- Dynamic aperture
- Dynamic aperture (accelerator physics)
- Dynamic equilibrium
- Dynamic light scattering
- Dynamic modulus
- Dynamic nuclear polarisation
- Dynamic pressure
- Dynamic scattering mode
- Dynamic speckle
- Dynamic stall
- Dynamic structure factor
- Dynamical billiards
- Dynamical friction
- Dynamical horizon
- Dynamical simulation
- Dynamical symmetry breaking
- Dynamical system
- Dynamical system (definition)
- Dynamical theory of diffraction
- Dynamical time scale
- Dynamics (mechanics)
- Dynamics of Markovian particles
- Dynamics of the celestial spheres
- Dynamitron
- Dynamo theory
- Dyon
- Dyson's eternal intelligence
- Dyson series
- Dyson sphere
- Dyson tree
- Dysprosium titanate
- Dénes Berényi
- Désiré van Monckhoven
- Détecteur à Grande Acceptance pour la Physique Photonucléaire Expérimentale (DAPHNE)
- Dühring's rule
