= Detlev =

Detlev is a German given name. It is a spelling variant of Detlef.

== People with this name ==
Notable people with this name include:

- Detlev Blanke (1941–2016), interlinguistics lecturer at Humboldt University of Berlin
- Detlev Bronk (1897–1975), President of Johns Hopkins University in Baltimore, Maryland
- Detlev Buchholz, theoretical physicist at Göttingen University
- Detlev Buck (born 1962), German film director and actor
- Otto Detlev Creutzfeldt (1927–1992), German physiologist and neurologist
- Detlev Dammeier (born 1968), German football coach and a former player
- Wilhelm Heinrich Detlev Körner (1878–1938), illustrator of the American West
- Detlev Lauscher (1952–2010), German footballer who played as a striker
- Detlev von Liliencron (1844–1909), German lyric poet and novelist from Kiel
- Detlev Mehlis (born 1949), Senior Public Prosecutor in the Office of the Attorney General in Berlin
- Detlev F. Neufert, German author, filmmaker and current president of the German Thai Media Association
- Detlev Peukert (1950–1990), German historian
- Detlev Ploog (1920–2005), German clinical psychiatrist, primate behavior researcher and anthropologist
- Christian Detlev Reventlow (1671–1738), Danish diplomat and military leader
- Detlev Karsten Rohwedder (1932–1991), German manager and politician (Social Democratic Party)
