= Detlef =

Detlef is a given name of German origin. It is also spelled Detlev.

== People with this name ==
Notable people with this name include:

- Detlef Bothe (canoeist) (born 1957), East German sprint canoeist
- Detlef Bothe (actor) (born 1965), German actor
- Detlef Bruckhoff (born 1958), retired German footballer
- Detlef Enge (1952–2025), East German football player
- Detlef Franke (1952–2007), German Egyptologist
- Detlef Gerstenberg (1957–1993), East German hammer thrower
- Detlef Gromoll (1938–2008), German mathematician
- Detlef Grumbach (born 1955), German author and journalist
- Detlef Hofmann (born 1963), German sprint canoeist
- Detlef Kästner (born 1958), East German boxer
- Detlef Kübeck (born 1956), retired East German sprinter
- Detlef Kirchhoff (born 1967), German rower
- Detlef Kraus (1919–2008), German pianist
- Detlef Laugwitz (1932–2000), German mathematician
- Detlef Lewe (1939–2008), West German sprint canoeist
- Detlef Lienau (1818–1887), German architect born in Denmark
- Detlef Lohse (born 1963), German fluid mechanics researcher
- Detlef Michel (born 1955), German track and field athlete
- Detlef Nebbe (1912–1972), SS-Hauptscharführer and member of staff at Auschwitz concentration camp
- Detleff Neumann-Neurode (1879–1945), pioneering German pediatric physical therapist
- Detlef Okrent (1909–1983), German field hockey player
- Detlef Pirsig (1945–2019), former German football player
- Detlef Quadfasel, professor of geophysics at Niels Bohr Institute
- Detlef Raugust (born 1954), German former footballer
- Detlef Richter (born 1956), East German bobsledder
- Detlef Sack (born 1965), professor of Comparative Political Science at Bielefeld University
- Detlef Schößler (born 1962), German former footballer, now a coach
- Detlef Schmidt (born 1958), West German sprint canoeist
- Detlef Schrempf (born 1963), retired German NBA basketball player
- Detlef Siebert, German television writer, director and producer, working in the UK
- Detlef Soost (born 1970), German dancer and choreographer
- Detlef Thorith (1942–2019), retired East German discus thrower
- Detlef Uhlemann (born 1949), former West German distance runner
- Detlef Ultsch (born 1955), former East German judoka
- Detlef Wagenknecht (born 1959), East German middle-distance runner
- Detlef Weigel (born 1961), German American scientist working at the interface of developmental and evolutionary biology
- Detlef Wiedeke (born 1950), German singer, composer and producer
- Gustavus Detlef Hinrichs (1836–1923), published findings on chemical element periodicity before Dmitri Mendeleev or Lothar Meyer
