= Doğan =

Doğan is a masculine Turkish given name and a unisex surname meaning Falcon. Notable people with the name include:

== Given name ==
- Doğan Abukay, Turkish experimental physicist and academic
- Doğan Akhanlı (1957–2021) Turkish-German writer
- Doğan Babacan (1930–2018), Turkish football referee
- Doğan Cüceloğlu (1938–2021), Turkish psychologist and nonfiction writer
- Doğan Hancı (born 1970), Turkish para-archer
- Doğan Kuban (1926–2021), Turkish architecture historian and academic
- Dogan Mehmet (born 1990), British folk singer of Turkish Cypriot descent
- Doğan Öz (1934–1978), Turkish prosecutor assassinated during his investigation of the Turkish deep state
- Doğan Türkmen, Turkish diplomat

== Middle name ==
- Gürbüz Doğan Ekşioğlu (born 1954), Turkish cartoonist and graphics designer
- Hasan Doğan Piker (born 1991), Turkish-American political commentator and Twitch streamer
- Turgut Doğan Şahin (born 1988), Turkish footballer

== Surname ==
- Ahmed Dogan (born 1954), Bulgarian politician of Turkish ethnicity
- Aydın Doğan (born 1936), Turkish billionaire media tycoon
- Aynur Doğan (born 1975), Kurdish singer and musician from Turkey
- Bahar Doğan (born 1974), Turkish long-distance runner
- Çetin Doğan (born 1940), Turkish general
- Deniz Doğan (born 1979), German footballer of Turkish descent
- Duygu Doğan (born 2000), Turkish female rhythmic gymnast
- Fidan Doğan (1982–2013), Kurdish activist
- Furkan Doğan (1991–2010), Turkish-American civil activist
- Harun Doğan (born 1976), Turkish sport wrestler
- Hasan Doğan (1956–2008), 37th president of the Turkish Football Federation
- Hüseyin Doğan (born 1994), Dutch footballer of Turkish descent
- Hüzeyfe Doğan (born 1981), Turkish-German football player
- Lütfi Doğan (politician, born 1930) (1930–2023), Turkish theologian and politician
- Lütfi Doğan (politician, born 1927) (1927–2018), Turkish academic, theologian and politician
- Mazlum Doğan (1956–1982), Kurdish separatist politician in Turkey
- Mehtap Doğan-Sızmaz (born 1978), Turkish female long-distance runner
- Mesut Doğan (born 1984), Turkish-Austrian futsal player
- Mustafa Doğan (born 1976), German footballer of Turkish descent
- Nedim Doğan (born 1943), Turkish football player
- Orhan Doğan (1955-2007), Turkish politician of Kurdish origin
- Selina Özuzun Doğan (born 1977), Armenian Turkish female lawyer and politician
- Vildan Doğan, Turkish female karateka
- Ziya Doğan (born 1961), Turkish football manager

== Fictional characters ==
- Doğan Alp, fictional character in the Turkish TV series Diriliş: Ertuğrul

== See also ==
- Doğan (disambiguation)
- Dugan, a surname
