= Hondros =

Hondros (Greek: Χόνδρος) is a Greek surname. Notable people with the surname include:

- Demetrius Hondros (1882–1962), Greek physicist
- Chris Hondros (1970–2011), American war photographer
  - Hondros, a 2017 American documentary film about Chris Hondros
- Ernest Hondros
