= Monthly Notices of the Royal Astronomical Society =

Peer-reviewed scientific journal

- Cover image of MNRAS in 2022
- Discipline: Astronomy, astrophysics
- Language: English
- Edited by: David Flower

Publication details
- Former name: Monthly Notices of the Astronomical Society of London
- History: 1827–present
- Publisher: Oxford University Press (since 2013) on behalf of the Royal Astronomical Society (United Kingdom)
- Frequency: 36/year
- Open access: Gold (since 2024)
- License: CC-BY (since 2024)
- Impact factor: 5.2 (2025)

Standard abbreviations
- ISO 4: Mon. Not. R. Astron. Soc.
- NLM: Mon Not R Astron Soc

Indexing
- CODEN: MNRAA4
- ISSN: 0035-8711 (print); 1365-2966 (web)
- LCCN: sf85001279
- OCLC no.: 10340650

Links
- Journal homepage; MNRAS online access; MNRAS Letters online access

Monthly Notices of the Royal Astronomical Society (MNRAS) is a peer-reviewed scientific journal in astronomy, astrophysics and related fields. It publishes original research in two formats: papers (of any length) and letters (limited to five pages). MNRAS publishes more articles per year than any other astronomy journal.

The learned society journal has been in continuous existence since 1827 and became online only in 2020. It operates as a partnership between the Royal Astronomical Society (RAS), who select and peer-review the contents, and Oxford University Press (OUP), who publish and market the journal. Despite its name, MNRAS is no longer monthly, nor does it carry the notices of the RAS. In 2024 MNRAS became a purely gold open access journal.

== History ==
The first issue of MNRAS was published on 9 February 1827 as Monthly Notices of the Astronomical Society of London and it has been in continuous publication ever since. It took its current name from the second volume, after the Astronomical Society of London became the Royal Astronomical Society (RAS). Until 1960 it carried the monthly notices of the RAS, at which time these were transferred to the newly established Quarterly Journal of the Royal Astronomical Society (1960–1996) and then to its successor journal Astronomy & Geophysics (since 1997). Until 1965, MNRAS was published in-house by the society; from 1965 to 2012 it was published by Blackwell Publishing (later part of Wiley-Blackwell) on behalf of the RAS. From 2013, MNRAS is published by Oxford University Press (OUP).

The journal is no longer monthly, with thirty-six issues a year divided into nine volumes. The Letters section had originally appeared on pink paper in the print edition, but moved online only in the early 2000s. Print publication ceased after the April 2020 volume, during the COVID-19 pandemic, with the journal becoming online-only.

== Content ==
MNRAS publishes peer-reviewed articles on original research in astronomy and astrophysics. Two sorts of article are carried by MNRAS: papers, which can be of any length, and letters, which are published more quickly but are limited to five pages in length. Editorial control of the journal is exercised by the RAS through an editorial board of professional astronomers; since July 2012, the editor-in-chief has been David Flower (University of Durham).

In 2022 MNRAS published 3441 articles, more than any other astronomy journal.

== Open access ==
In January 2024 MNRAS became a gold open access journal, making all articles free to read online as soon as they are published, under a Creative Commons Attribution (CC-BY) licence. There are no subscription fees for readers, instead the costs of publication are met by an article processing charge (APC) on the authors. As of June 2024, the APCs are £2310 for a standard article and £1100 for a letter; RAS Fellows receive a 20% discount on these fees. In many cases the APCs are paid for by a read and publish agreement between the author's institution and OUP, and authors based in developing countries are entitled to an APC waiver. If an author is not from a developing country but is unable to pay the APC, MNRAS provides partial or full waivers on a case-by-case basis.

=== Former policy ===
Prior to 2024, MNRAS used a combination of green open access, delayed open access (36 months) and optional hybrid open access. There were no fees for authors, from the founding of the journal in 1827 until the end of 2023, with all costs of publications being met by subscriptions. Green open access was encouraged through self-archiving by authors on personal webpages, in institutional repositories, and on the arXiv preprint server. Fellows of the RAS were provided with free online access to the RAS journals as part of their membership benefits.

== Editors-in-chief ==
The following persons have served as Editor-in-Chief (formerly titled Managing Editor or simply Editor):

- David Flower (2012–present)
- Robert Carswell (2008–2012)
- Andy Fabian (1994–2008)
- John Shakeshaft (?–1994)
- Roger Tayler (1979–?)
- Function performed by the Secretaries of the RAS Council (1881–1979)
- Arthur Cayley (1874–1881)
- Richard Proctor (1872–1874)
- Arthur Cayley (1860–1872)
- Robert Grant (?–1881)
- Richard Sheepshanks

== Abstracting and indexing ==
The journal is abstracted and indexed in:

- Academic Search
- Advanced Polymers Abstracts
- Aerospace & High Technology Database
- Astrophysics Data System
- Ceramic Abstracts
- Computer & Information Systems Abstracts
- CSA Civil Engineering Abstracts (ProQuest)
- CSA Mechanical & Transportation Engineering Abstracts
- CSA Technology Research Database
- Current Contents/Physical, Chemical & Earth Sciences
- Current Index to Statistics
- Earthquake Engineering Abstracts
- Engineered Materials Abstracts
- InfoTrac
- Inspec
- International Aerospace Abstracts & Database
- Materials Business File
- METADEX
- Meteorological & Geoastrophysical Abstracts
- Science Citation Index
- Scopus
- VINITI Database RAS

According to the Journal Citation Reports, the journal has a 2022 impact factor of 4.8.

== See also ==
- The Astronomical Journal
- The Astrophysical Journal
- Astronomy & Astrophysics
- Astronomy & Geophysics
