= Ploog =

Ploog is a surname. Notable people with the surname include:

- Detlev Ploog (1920–2005), German clinical psychiatrist
- Dick Ploog (1936–2002), Australian cyclist
- Mike Ploog (born 1942), American storyboard and comic book artist
- Richard Ploog (born 1962), Australian drummer, songwriter, producer and singer
