= Denaturation =

Denaturation may refer to:

- Denaturation (biochemistry), a structural change in macromolecules caused by extreme conditions
- Denaturation (fissile materials), transforming fissile materials so that they cannot be used in nuclear weapons
- Denaturation (food), intentional adulteration of food or drink rendering it unfit for consumption while remaining suitable for other uses

== See also ==
- Denatured alcohol, also known as methylated spirit
- Denaturalization, the reverse of naturalization, when a state deprives one of its citizens of his or her citizenship
