= Astronomy & Geophysics =

- Cover of the June 2022 issue
- Discipline: Astronomy, geophysics, planetary science
- Language: English
- Edited by: Sue Bowler

Publication details
- Former names: Occasional Notes of the Royal Astronomical Society, Quarterly Journal of the Royal Astronomical Society
- History: 1997–present
- Publisher: Oxford University Press (since 2013)
- Frequency: Bimonthly
- Open access: Hybrid
- Impact factor: 0.549 (2020)

Standard abbreviations
- ISO 4: Astron. Geophys.

Indexing
- ISSN: 1366-8781 (print); 1468-4004 (web)
- OCLC no.: 46686009

Links
- Journal homepage; Online access

Astronomy & Geophysics (A&G) is a scientific periodical and trade magazine published on behalf of the Royal Astronomical Society (RAS) by Oxford University Press. It is distributed bimonthly to members of the RAS.

A&G publishes content of interest to professional astronomers and geophysicists, including: news reports, interviews, topical reviews, historical investigations, obituaries, meeting reports and updates on the activities of the RAS. A&G does not publish original research papers or perform peer review.

A&G was established in 1997 as a glossy magazine replacement for the Quarterly Journal of the Royal Astronomical Society (QJRAS; 1960–1996); it continues the same volume numbering from QJRAS. The editor is Sue Bowler of the University of Leeds.

== Scope ==
The journal covers astronomy, astrophysics, cosmology, planetary science, solar-terrestrial physics, global and regional geophysics, and the history of these subjects. It also publishes thematic articles regarding interdisciplinary research, science policy, news, opinions, correspondence, and book and software reviews. Royal Astronomical Society communications about events and people and obituaries are also within this journal's purview.

Furthermore, in keeping with the tradition of the Quarterly Journal of the Royal Astronomical Society, it publishes discussions of fundamental science and scientific debates. The journal also functions as a channel of communication between the membership, the council, and the Society's Officers.

Contributions to Astronomy & Geophysics are not restricted to RAS members.

== Abstracting and indexing ==
A&G abstracted and indexed in:

- Academic Search (including Academic Search Elite and Academic Search Premier)
- Current Contents/Physical, Chemical & Earth Sciences
- InfoTrac
- Meteorological & Geoastrophysical Abstracts
- ProQuest 5000
- Science Citation Index
- Scopus

According to the 2020 Journal Citation Reports, A&G has an impact factor of 0.549.

== Quarterly Journal of the Royal Astronomical Society ==
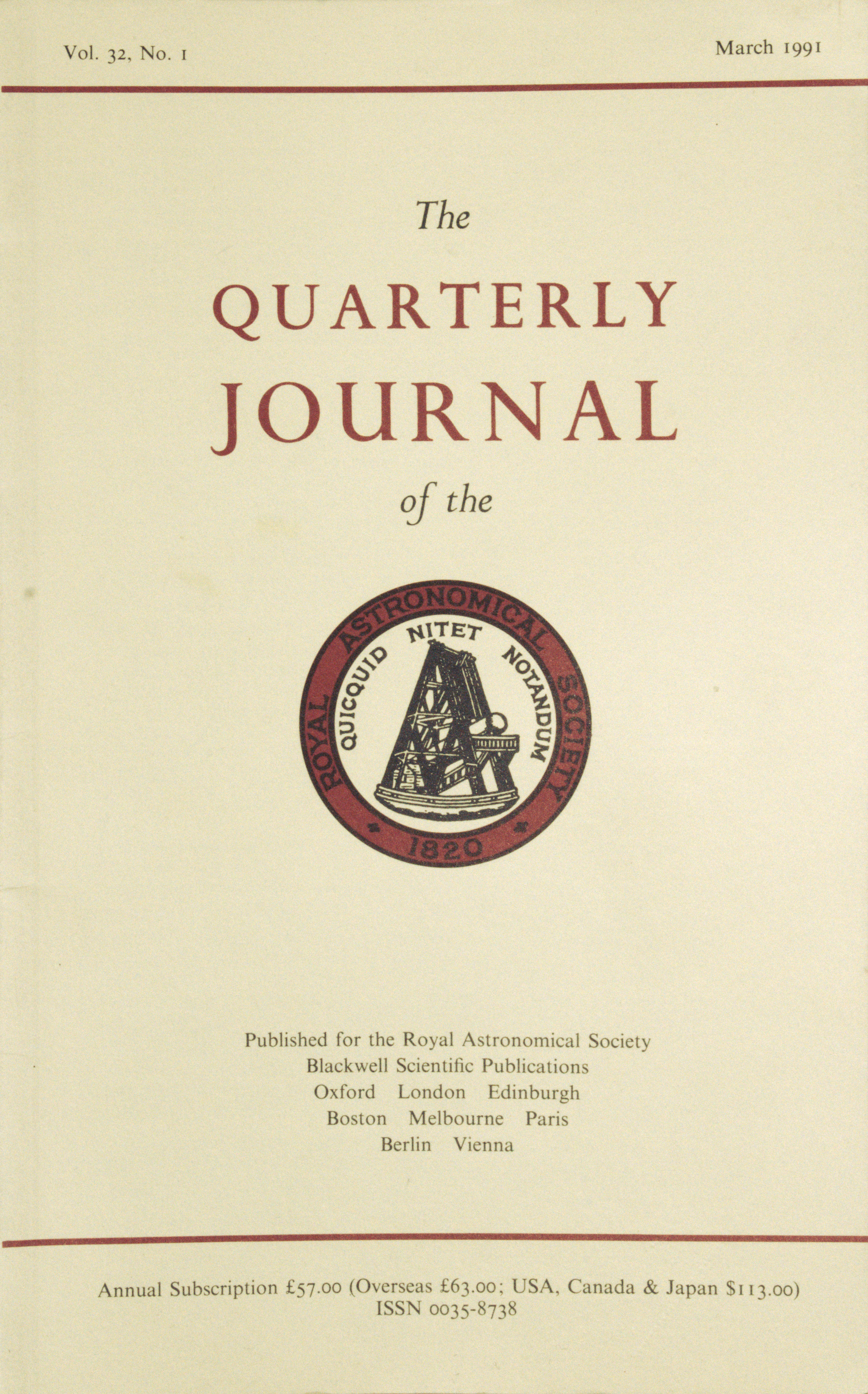
The front cover of an edition of the Quarterly Journal of the Royal Astronomical Society

The Quarterly Journal of the Royal Astronomical Society (Q. J. R. Astron. Soc, ISSN 0035-8738) was published by the Royal Astronomical Society from September 1960 to December 1996, and was produced by Blackwell Science in its later period. During that time 37 volumes were issued. The journal included articles reviewing modern astronomy or geophysics, discussions about research topics, meeting reports, contributions about the history of science, and reports of astronomical research groups and institutes. It gave less emphasis to detailed scientific research papers, which instead were published in the society's Monthly Notices. (ISSN 0308-3322).

Before 1960 the Royal Astronomical Society had published proceedings of its activities in its Monthly Notices alongside research papers, and published research reviews in its Occasional Notes. The Quarterly Journal was established in 1960 to free the Monthly Notices to concentrate on original research, and the Occasional Notes were discontinued.

=== Editors of the Quarterly Journal ===
- David Dewhirst, 1960–1965
- C. Andrew Murray, 1965–1970
- A. Jack Meadows, 1970–1975
- Simon Mitton, 1976–1980
- David W. Hughes, 1981–1985
- George H. A. Cole, 1986–1991
- Robert C. Smith, 1992–1995
- David W. Hughes, 1996.

=== Abstracting and indexing for Quarterly Journal of the Royal Astronomical Society ===
The Quarterly Journal of the Royal Astronomical Society was formerly indexed in:

- GeoRef
- International Aerospace Abstracts
- Computer & Control Abstracts
- Electrical & Electronics Abstracts
- Physics Abstracts. Science Abstracts. Series A
- Chemical Abstracts

All articles are indexed, with abstracts, in the Astrophysics Data System, which includes scans of all pages. The ADS bibliographic code is QJRAS.

== See also ==
- Monthly Notices of the Royal Astronomical Society
- Geophysical Journal International
