= Eugen Dühring =

German philosopher and socialist (1833–1921)

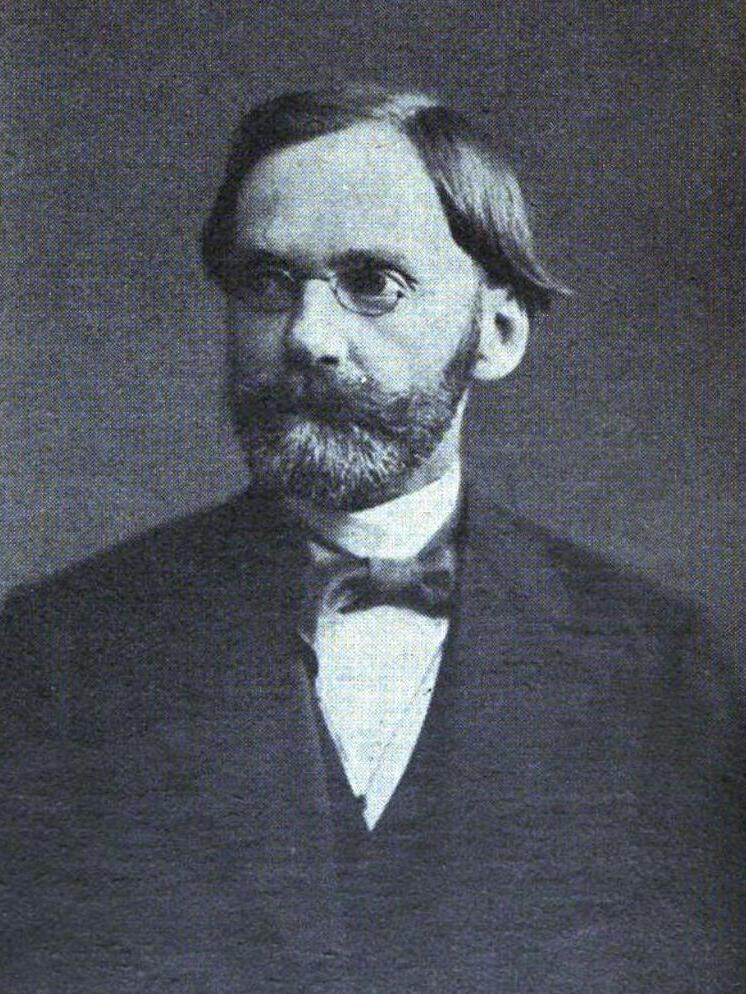
- Dühring, c. 1880s
- Born: 12 January 1833; Berlin, Kingdom of Prussia
- Died: 21 September 1921 (aged 88); Nowawes, Weimar Republic

Education
- Education: University of Berlin

Philosophical work
- School: Positivism, socialism, materialism
- Institutions: University of Berlin
- Main interests: Philosophy, political economy, social theory, history of science
- Notable ideas: Philosophy of the actual (Wirklichkeitsphilosophie), "societarian" system, critical history, racial antisemitism

Karl Eugen Dühring (12 January 1833 – 21 September 1921) was a German philosopher, economist, and socialist. Despite becoming blind in early adulthood, he was a prolific and popular lecturer at the University of Berlin. His "philosophy of the actual" was a comprehensive, materialist system that challenged German idealism, classical economics, and organized religion. He also made significant contributions to economics, law, and the natural sciences.

In the 1870s, Dühring's ideas gained significant influence within the burgeoning German Social Democratic movement, prompting Friedrich Engels to write his major polemic Anti-Dühring, which became a foundational work of Marxism. Dühring's academic career ended in 1877 with a controversial dismissal from the university following his accusations of plagiarism against Hermann von Helmholtz. The affair caused a public outcry and a student protest movement, with Dühring cast as a martyr for free thought.

After his dismissal, Dühring's thought became increasingly personal and radical. His writings took a sharply antisemitic turn, culminating in his 1881 book The Jewish Question, a key text in the history of modern, racial antisemitism. His later work advocated an extreme form of individualism which he termed "personalism", and he spent the last decades of his life in relative obscurity, promoting his views through his self-published journal, Personalist und Emancipator.

== Life ==
=== Early life and education (1833–1868) ===
Karl Eugen Dühring was born on 12 January 1833 in Berlin, Kingdom of Prussia. His father, Wilhelm Ferdinand Dühring, was a Prussian civil servant and a former soldier in the Napoleonic Wars. The family was of Thuringian origin. Wilhelm Dühring was a free-thinker who admired the values of the French Revolution and educated his son at home for a time, emphasizing self-reliance and instilling in him a streak of "intellectual iconoclasm". After his father's death from tuberculosis in 1845, Dühring attended the Köllnische Realgymnasium and later the Joachimsthal Gymnasium. He was an excellent student, particularly in Latin and Greek.

In 1853, Dühring began studying law at Berlin's Friedrich Wilhelm University. He grew deeply disappointed with the university's intellectual atmosphere, which was dominated by the historical school of law founded by Friedrich Carl von Savigny. Dühring found this "pseudo-historicism" lacking in philosophical grounding and rational principles, believing it was overly focused on philology and historical detail at the expense of true natural law. He deeply resented the religious overtones in the German education system. During this period, he turned to extracurricular studies in economics, reading Adam Smith and French socialist writers.

After finishing his dissertation in 1861, Dühring began work as a lawyer. Soon after, a progressive eye ailment, which had begun earlier, worsened dramatically, leading to his complete blindness. Forced to abandon his legal career, he decided to become an academic and a writer. He saw his blindness not merely as a handicap but as an opportunity to develop a new, "fresher" method of scholarship, free from what he called the "rotten scholarly manner" he had detested as a student. He believed his condition "actually increased his enthusiasm for justice, truth, and trying to create a new unique approach to scholarship". He developed a method of working where his wife, Emilie Gladow (a former nurse to his aunt), and later his sons, read texts aloud to him; he would then compose his works in his head and dictate them.

Dühring completed his doctoral thesis in philosophy under Adolf Trendelenburg and received his habilitation in 1863, which qualified him to lecture. He began a career as a Privatdozent (an unsalaried lecturer paid by student fees) at the University of Berlin in 1864. In 1866, he also received a habilitation in political economy, an unusual combination of disciplines at the time. His lectures, known for their lively and demonstrative style, became very popular, drawing more students than many of the tenured professors.

=== Rise to prominence and controversy (1868–1877) ===
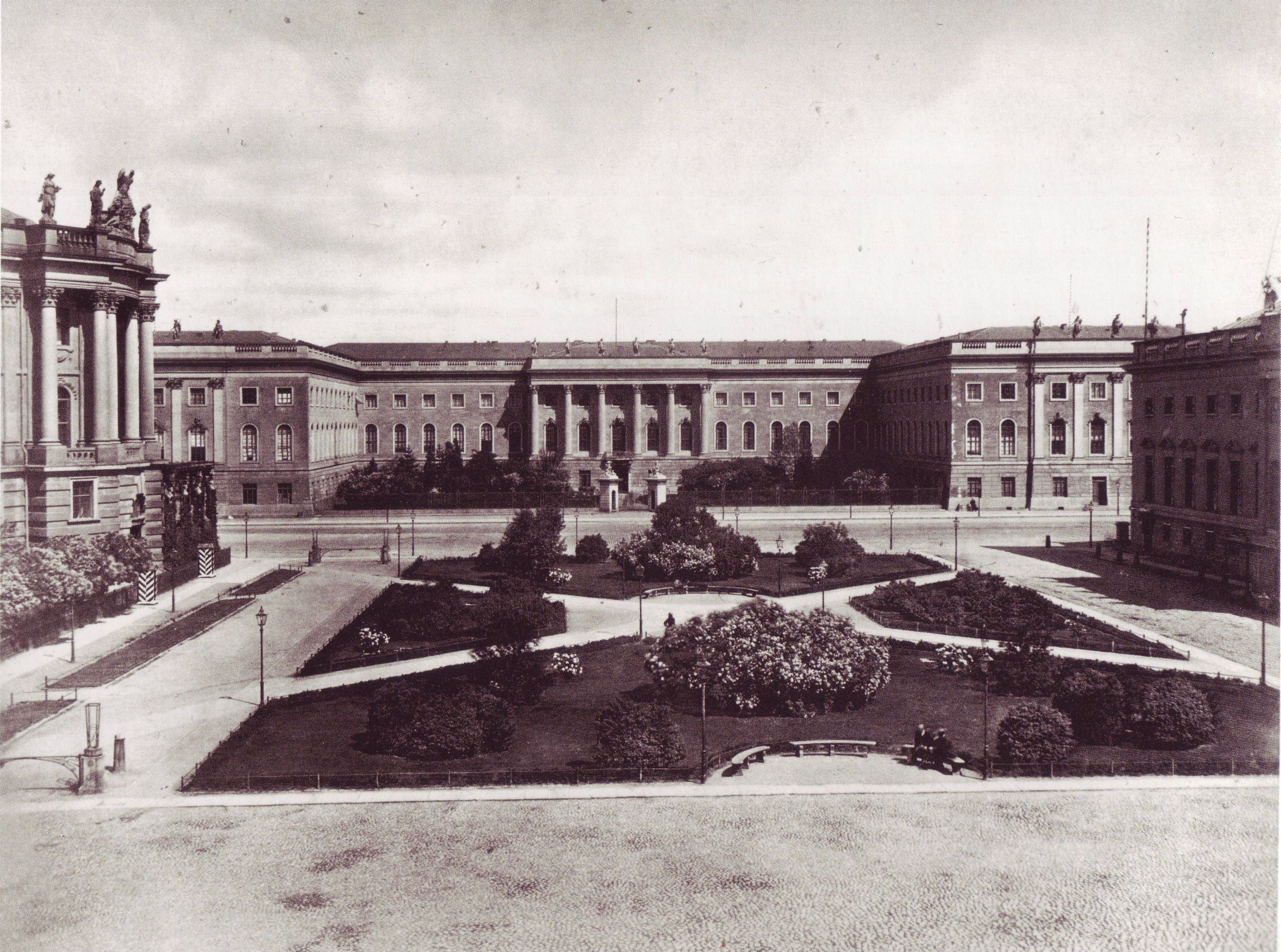
Main building of the University of Berlin, c. 1880

Dühring gained national notoriety through the "Social Exposé Scandal of 1868". He had been commissioned by Hermann Wagener, an advisor to Chancellor Otto von Bismarck, to write a position paper on the "social question" and the workers' movement. The paper was subsequently published, first anonymously and then under Wagener's name, without Dühring's consent. Dühring felt his honor had been insulted and successfully sued Wagener, winning a public battle that cast him as a courageous fighter against the Prussian state. The scandal made him a well-known and sympathetic figure, particularly among socialist agitators.

His academic output was immense. Between 1865 and 1866 alone, he published five books, including Natural Dialectic, Capital and Labor, and The Worth of Life. In 1871, his Critical History of the General Principles of Mechanics won the prestigious Benecke Prize from the University of Göttingen. The judging committee, which included the philosopher Hermann Lotze, praised the work's "complete and free command of the matter and amazing extension of exact literary knowledge".

Despite his academic success, Dühring's relationship with the university establishment grew increasingly hostile. He was passed over for a professorship in philosophy in 1866. His writings became more critical of his colleagues, particularly the Kathedersozialisten ("socialists of the chair") like Gustav Schmoller and Adolph Wagner, whom he attacked by name. This led to a public conflict with Wagner in 1874, resulting in an official warning to both men from the university faculty. During this time, he also became a lecturer at the Victoria Lyceum, a new secondary school for girls, and published Women’s Path to Higher Vocational Training, championing the cause of women's education.

By the mid-1870s, Dühring's system of thought had reached its mature form, and his influence within the German Social Democratic movement was at its peak. Prominent socialists like August Bebel, Johann Most, and the young Eduard Bernstein were drawn to his work, which offered a systematic and seemingly independent alternative to both Lassalleanism and the still-obscure theories of Karl Marx. Bernstein later recalled that Dühring's "pragmatic-positive form" of socialism "spoke to me all the more" than the abstract declarations of the Communist Manifesto.

=== Dismissal and Anti-Dühring ===
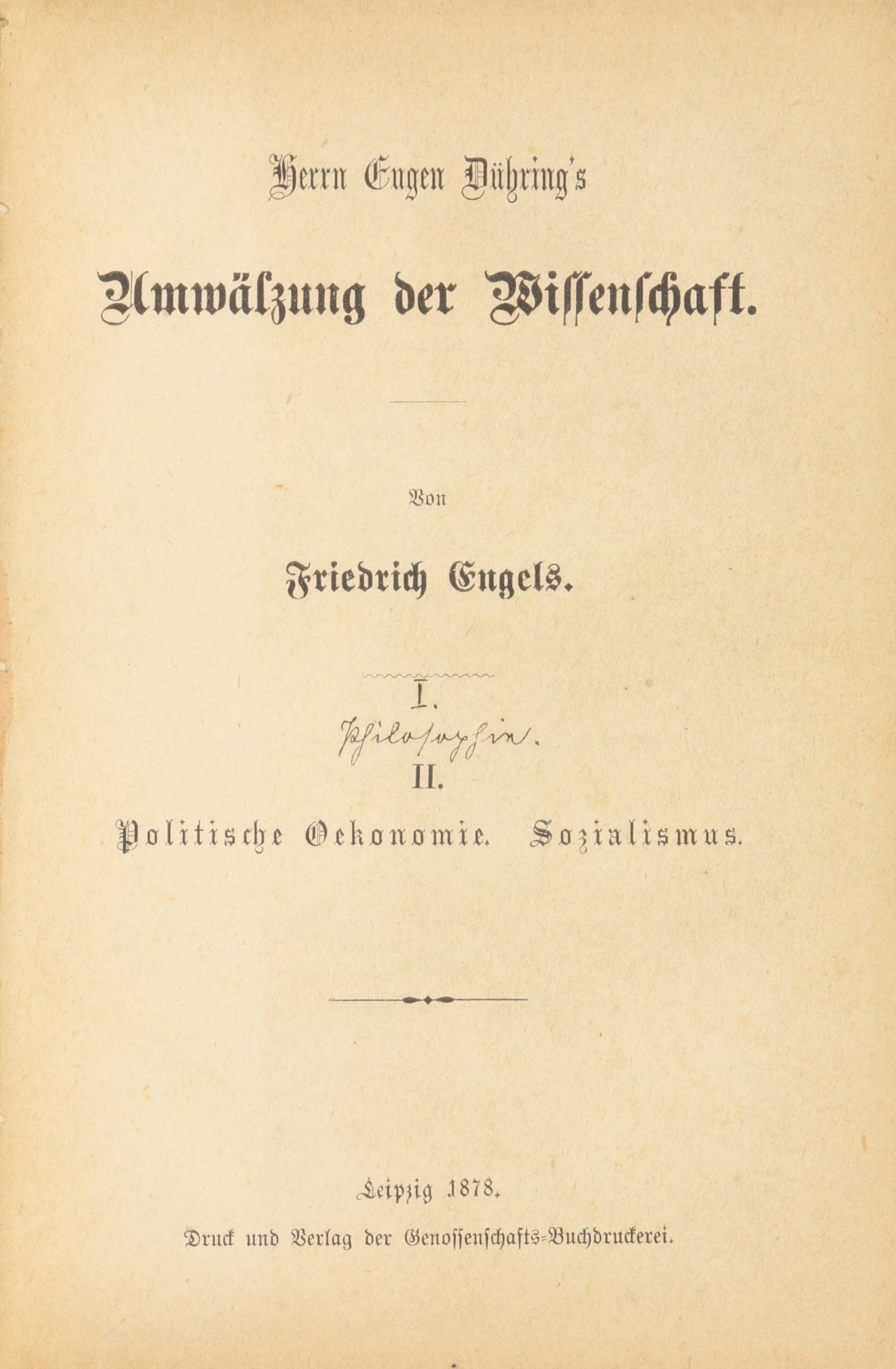
Title page of Friedrich Engels's Anti-Dühring (1878)

Dühring's growing influence on German socialism caused alarm for Marx and Friedrich Engels. In 1876, at Marx's urging, Engels began writing a series of articles for the Social Democratic newspaper Vorwärts to systematically dismantle Dühring's system. These articles were later collected into the book Herr Eugen Dühring's Revolution in Science, popularly known as Anti-Dühring. The work became a comprehensive and accessible exposition of what would become orthodox Marxism, covering philosophy, political economy, and socialism.

In May 1877, just as Engels's polemic was underway, the University of Berlin moved to dismiss Dühring. The official reason cited his disrespectful and polemical attacks against prominent academics, particularly the insinuation in the second edition of his Critical History of Mechanics that the renowned physicist Hermann von Helmholtz had plagiarized Julius Robert von Mayer's discovery of the law of conservation of energy. The dismissal, which took effect in the middle of the semester, caused a public uproar. The press and the public largely sided with the "erudite blind lecturer" against the university elite. A petition signed by 250 students was submitted in protest, and a large public gathering of over 2,500 students and citizens was held in Berlin to denounce the university's actions. The Social Democrats, including those who would later become Dühring's opponents, organized in his defense, viewing him as a "martyr for science".

Despite the widespread support, Dühring's alliance with the students and socialists quickly disintegrated. His authoritarian character and increasingly coarse polemics alienated his supporters. He publicly distanced himself from the Social Democrats, who he accused of using him for their own ends, and his plans to establish a "Free University" with socialist backing collapsed amid personal disputes. By the end of 1877, Dühring found himself isolated from both the academic establishment and the socialist movement. Engels's book, published in 1878, further accelerated the decline of Dühring's influence.

=== Later life, work, and death (1877–1921) ===
After his dismissal, Dühring's thought entered a new, more radical phase. Financially secure from a timely inheritance from his admirer Henry Charles Carey, he devoted himself to writing. His work became increasingly focused on what he perceived as the corrupting influence of Judaism. In 1881, he published Die Judenfrage als Racen-, Sitten- und Culturfrage (The Jewish Question as a Question of Race, Morals, and Culture). The book, which went through seven editions, was a foundational text of modern, secular, and racial antisemitism. He argued that the "Semitic race" was inherently immoral and that the "Jewish spirit" was an agent of national corruption.

In the late 1880s and 1890s, a "Dühring movement" emerged. His supporters, who saw themselves as advancing a "societarian" alternative to Marxism, organized an "address movement" in 1886 to protest his exclusion from public life, gathering over 20,000 signatures. In 1893, they founded the Sozialitärer Bund (Societarian League) and a journal, Der Moderne Völkergeist (The Modern Spirit of Nations), which promoted Dühring's ideas, including his anti-Semitism. This movement also collapsed by the end of the decade due to internal conflicts.

From 1899 until his death, Dühring published his own bi-monthly journal, Personalist und Emancipator, from his home in Nowawes, a village near Potsdam. In this final phase, his thought turned toward an extreme individualism. He abandoned his earlier socialist projects, such as the "economic communes", and re-embraced private property. He now saw social reform as a matter of individual will and "personalism" against all forms of collectivism. His polemics became even more vitriolic, attacking not only his enemies but also revered figures of German culture like Johann Wolfgang von Goethe and Immanuel Kant.

Dühring suffered a personal tragedy in 1880 with the death of his younger son, Ernst. His wife Emilie, his long-time companion and amanuensis, died in 1911. In his final years, he also lost his hearing. He died on 21 September 1921 at the age of 88.

== Thought ==
Dühring's ambition was to create a comprehensive system that would replace the dominant German Idealism with a new philosophy grounded in materialism and modern science. He called his system Wirklichkeitsphilosophie ("philosophy of the actual"), emphasizing its focus on the concrete, observable world. His thought is characterized by a strong rationalism, a belief in the power of the conscious intellect, and a "Promethean" will to challenge and overcome all forms of unjust authority, whether intellectual, political, or religious.

=== Philosophy ===
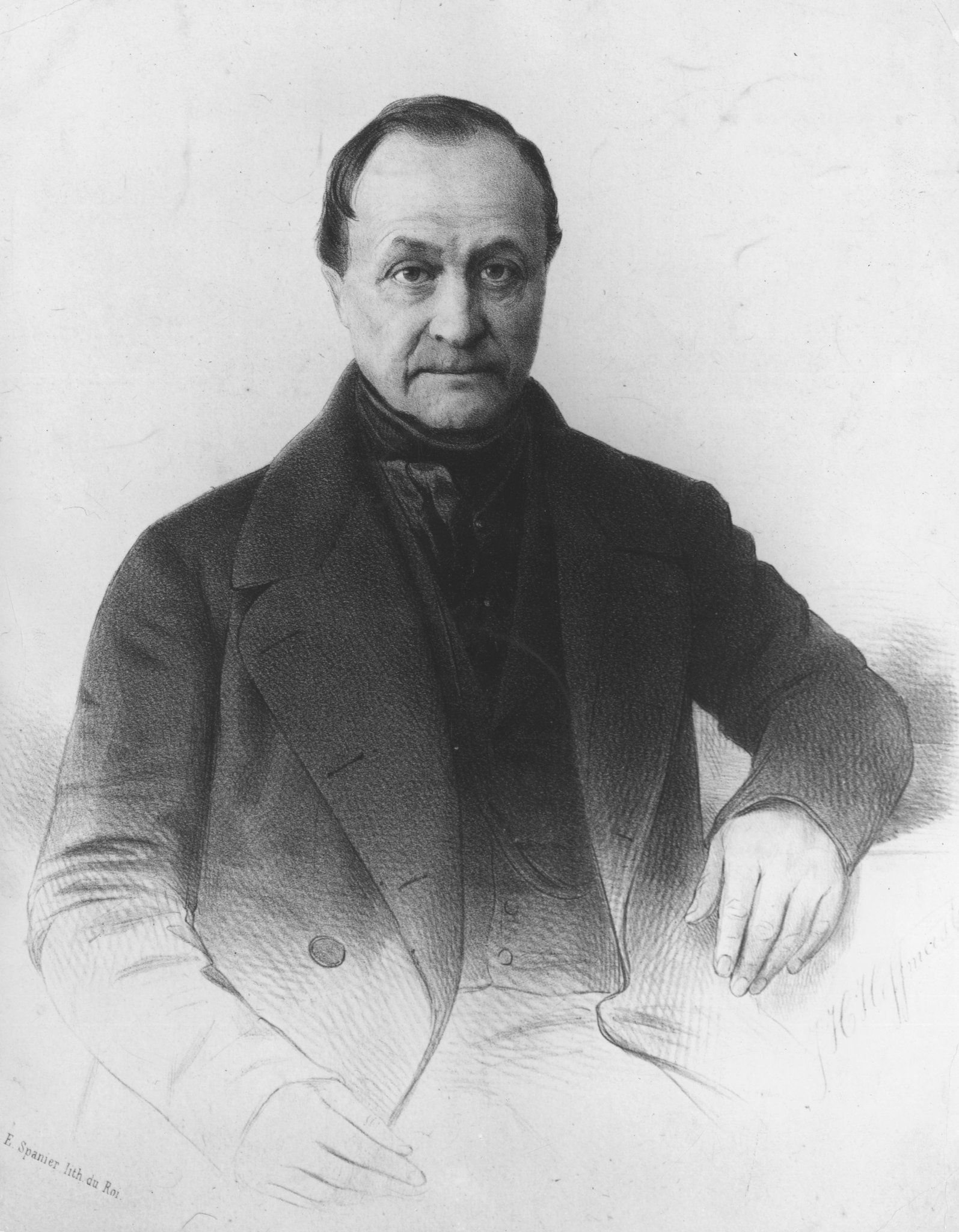
Auguste Comte

Dühring's philosophy was heavily influenced by the positivism of Auguste Comte, whose rejection of metaphysics he praised, and the individualism of Arthur Schopenhauer, whose clear style and critique of academic philosophy he admired. However, he rejected Comte's neglect of human emotion and Schopenhauer's pessimism and metaphysics of the will. He was also influenced by Ludwig Feuerbach's materialist critique of religion.

The foundation of his system is an ontology that rejects both dualism and infinity. The "Actual" is a single, unified, and finite totality. A key tenet is the "law of the determinate number," which posits that the concepts of an infinite past, an infinite causal chain, or an infinite number are logical contradictions. The universe must therefore have had an absolute beginning and be finite in its composition. Change is driven by the "law of difference," an inherent antagonism between forces that creates motion and development from an original, unchangeable "primordial nucleus".

In epistemology, Dühring was a staunch realist, rejecting Kant's distinction between phenomena and noumena. He argued that the human intellect is capable of objective knowledge of the world as it truly is. His ethics were eudaemonistic, asserting that the goal of life is a positive "estimation of life" achieved through overcoming obstacles. He advocated for a "reagent pessimism"—an active, indignant pessimism that fights against evil and injustice—in contrast to what he saw as the passive, world-denying pessimism of Schopenhauer.

=== Political economy and social theory ===
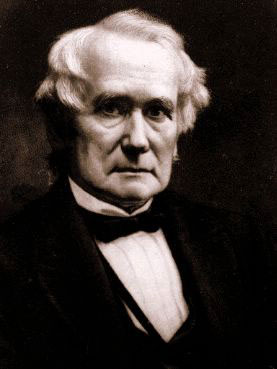
Henry Charles Carey

Dühring's economic thought was a direct challenge to the laissez-faire doctrines of the British classical school. He was heavily influenced by the "American School" of protectionist economics, particularly the work of Henry Charles Carey and Friedrich List. He argued that economic laws were not universally applicable but were shaped by national and political contexts.

He divided economics into two spheres: "production," governed by natural and technical laws, and "distribution," governed by social and political power. He saw the history of society as fundamentally shaped by the use of force, which created unjust systems of distribution, such as rent and interest on capital. He referred to the state based on such force as the Gewaltstaat ("violent state") and property derived from it as Gewalteigentum ("property based on violence"). His theory of justice was based on the "principle of balance," rooted in a natural, reactive instinct of revenge or retribution against injustice.

His social theory, which he called a "societarian" system, aimed to create a "free society" by overcoming all forms of domination and coercion. In the 1870s, he proposed a system of "economic communes"—autonomous, cooperative communities based on a common language and ancestry, where labor, not capital, would be the basis of earnings. These communes would engage in free trade with each other, use metallic currency, and be governed by principles of direct democracy and self-management. This system represented an attempt to create a "post-utopian" socialism grounded in realistic economic mechanisms rather than revolutionary upheaval.

=== Natural sciences ===
In addition to his work in philosophy and social science, Dühring wrote on mechanics, chemistry, and physics. A significant portion of his scientific work was a defense of the physicist Julius Robert von Mayer, whom he championed as the true discoverer of energy equivalence, accusing Hermann von Helmholtz of plagiarism. Dühring cemented his own legacy in thermodynamics with the introduction of "Dühring's rule", a principle that proclaims a linear relationship between the temperatures at which two solutions exert the same vapor pressure. He also claimed to have invented the rhigometer, a device for measuring extremely low temperatures.

=== View of history ===
Dühring developed a concept of "critical history," which he distinguished from what he called "pseudo-historicism" (the mere accumulation of facts) and the speculative philosophies of history like Georg Wilhelm Friedrich Hegel's. Critical history's purpose is not to study the past for its own sake, but to "make history" by discovering and transmitting the "heroic dispositions" (Gesinnung) of great, enlightened individuals of the past. These heroic figures, such as Giordano Bruno, Jean-Jacques Rousseau, and Mayer, form an intellectual lineage of "defiant outsiders" who have battled against the corrupt establishments of their time.

His historical writing is thus a form of "revisionism" that re-evaluates the standard intellectual narratives. He elevated pre-Socratic thinkers over Plato, John Locke over Kant, and Carey over Adam Smith and the entire British school of economics.

== Legacy and influence ==
Dühring's influence was intense but short-lived. In the 1870s, he was a major intellectual force whose system threatened to become the dominant theory within German Social Democracy. Engels's Anti-Dühring, written to counter this threat, played a crucial role in codifying Marxism and marginalizing Dühring's influence within the socialist movement.

Nevertheless, his ideas left a mark on several important thinkers. Friedrich Nietzsche was an early reader of Dühring's works in the 1870s; while he came to despise Dühring, elements of his thought, such as his critique of Schopenhauer and his theory of justice based on resentment (ressentiment), show Dühring's influence. Nietzsche engaged with Dühring's arguments against an infinite past in developing his own concept of the eternal return. Theodor Herzl, the founder of modern Zionism, studied Dühring as a student in Vienna. Eduard Bernstein, the father of "revisionist" socialism, credited Dühring's liberal economic ideas as an important early influence that pointed toward a reformist, rather than revolutionary, path for socialism. The sociologist Franz Oppenheimer also drew heavily on Dühring's distinction between "political" and "economic" means and his theory of the state's origin in force, developing his own theory of "liberal socialism".

After his death, Dühring's legacy was overwhelmingly defined by his antisemitism, and he was later claimed by some Nazis as a forerunner. Most scholars, however, note that his staunch individualism, rationalism, and opposition to nationalism and "historical romanticism" are incompatible with National Socialism. His biographer, James Gay, argues that while Dühring's late-career radicalism and bigotry were destructive, his earlier work represents a highly original and comprehensive attempt by a "learned scholar to thoroughly and coherently address fundamental quandaries and issues facing man in the modern world".

== Selected works ==
- Natürliche Dialektik (Natural Dialectic), 1865
- Der Werth des Lebens (The Worth of Life), 1865
- Kritische Grundlegung der Volkswirtschaftslehre (Critical Foundation of Political Economy), 1866
- Kritische Geschichte der Philosophie (Critical History of Philosophy), 1869
- Kritische Geschichte der Nationalökonomie und des Sozialismus (Critical History of Political Economy and Socialism), 1871
- Cursus der National- und Socialökonomie (Course on National and Social Economy), 1873
- Cursus der Philosophie (Course on Philosophy), 1875
- Logik und Wissenschaftstheorie (Logic and Theory of Science), 1878
- Die Judenfrage als Racen-, Sitten- und Culturfrage (The Jewish Question as a Question of Race, Morals and Culture), 1881
- Sache, Leben und Feinde (Cause, Life and Enemies), 1882
