= Fog bow =

Type of rainbow formed by fog droplets

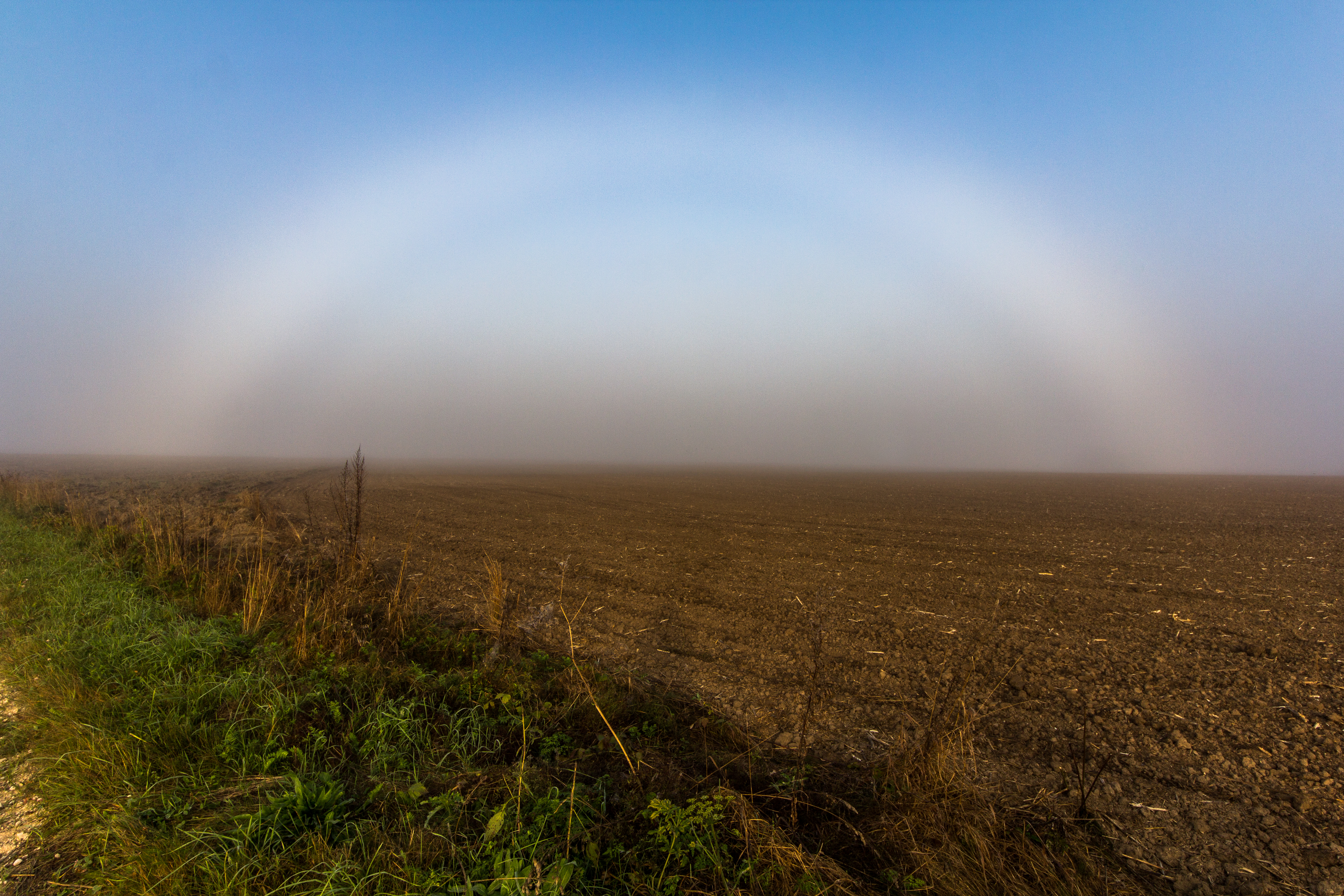
Fogbow over a field

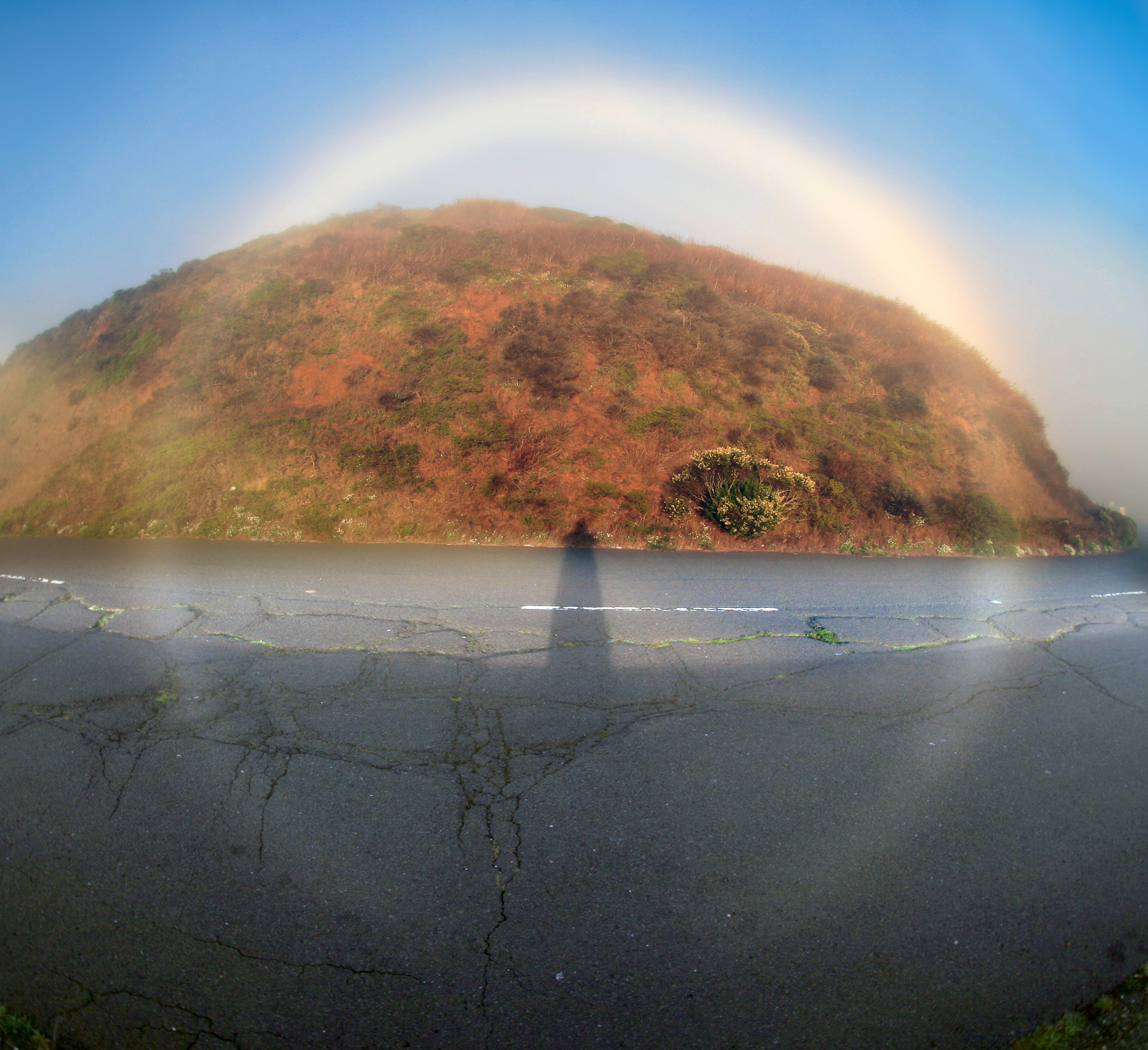
360-degree fogbow

A fog bow, sometimes called a white rainbow, is a phenomenon similar to a rainbow; however, as its name suggests, it appears as a bow in fog rather than rain. Because of the very small size of water droplets that cause fog—smaller than 0.05 millimeters (0.0020 in)—the fog bow has only very weak colors, with a red outer edge and bluish inner edge. The colors fade due to being smeared out by the diffraction effect of the smaller droplets.

In many cases, when the droplets are very small, fog bows appear white, and are therefore sometimes called white rainbows. Along with its larger angular size, this lack of color is a feature of a fog bow that distinguishes it from a glory, which has multiple pale-colored rings caused by diffraction. When droplets forming it are almost all of the same size, the fog bow can have multiple inner rings, or supernumeraries, which are more strongly colored than the main bow.

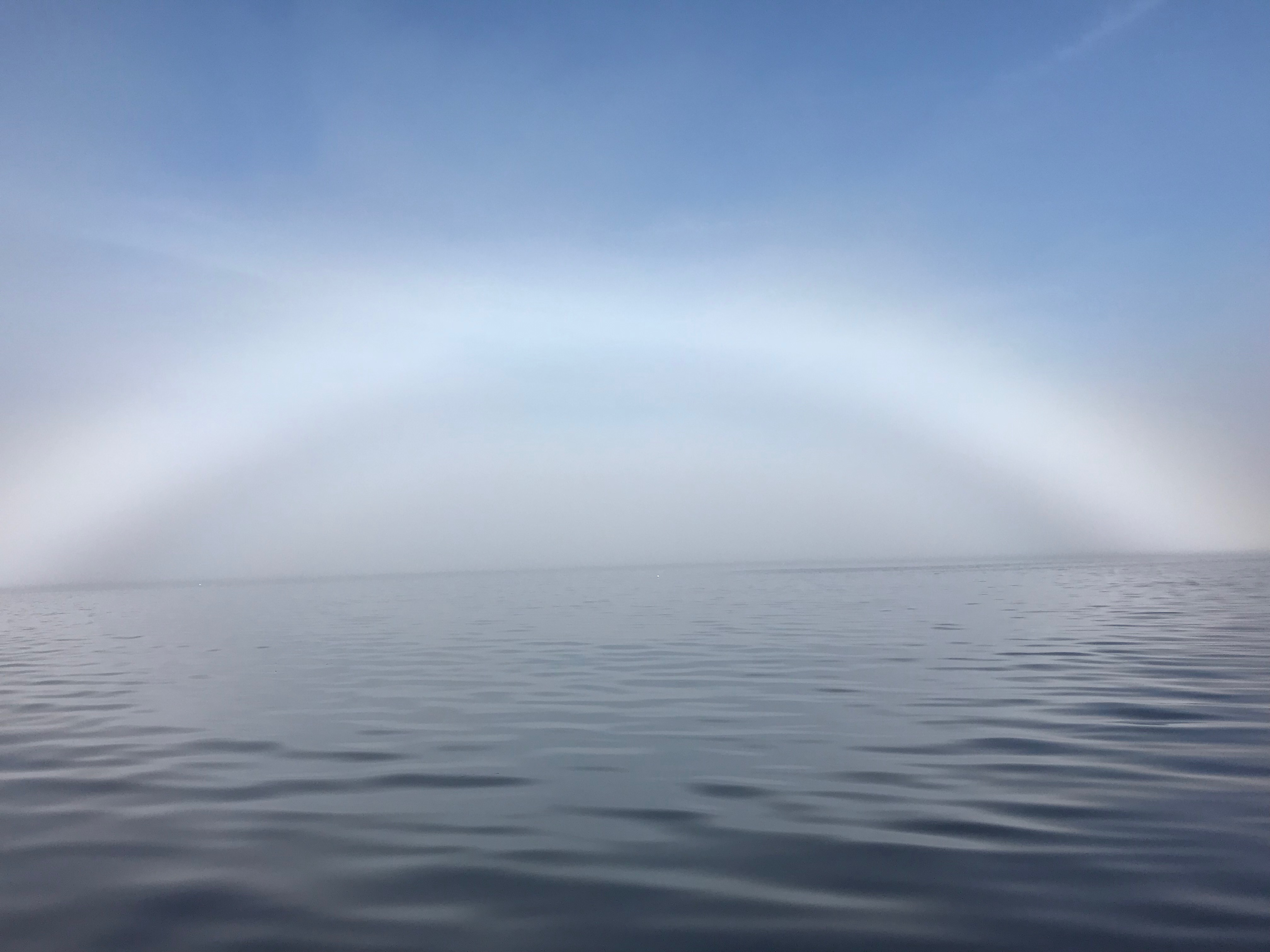
Fogbow over the ocean

A fog bow seen in clouds, typically from an aircraft looking downwards, is called a cloud bow. Mariners sometimes call fog bows sea-dogs.

== Direction ==
A fog bow is seen in the same direction as a rainbow, thus the sun would be behind the head of the observer and the direction of view would be into a bank of fog (which may not be noticeable in directions away from the bow itself). Its outer radius is slightly less than that of a rainbow.

When a fog bow appears at night, it is called a lunar fog bow.

== See also ==
- Circumhorizontal arc
- Circumzenithal arc
- Cloud iridescence
- Dewbow
- Halo
- Moonbow
- Sun dog
