= Doğan (disambiguation) =

Doğan (Turkish: Falcon) is a Turkish origin masculine given name and a surname. It may also refer to:

- Doğan class fast attack craft, a Fast Attack Craft/Missile Boat class of the Turkish Navy
- Doğan Group Companies, a part of Doğan Media Group
- Doğan Media Group, a Turkish media conglomerate, part of Doğan Holding
- Doğan Holding, an industrial conglomerate in Turkey
- Doğan Seyfi Atlı Stadium, a football stadium in Denizli, Turkey
- Doğan Türk Birliği, a sports club based in Girne, Northern Cyprus
- MV Karadeniz Powership Doğan Bey, a Liberia-flagged floating power plant, owned and operated by a Turkish company
- Bulgarian name for Avia B-534 1930s fighter
- Doğan, Buldan, village in Turkey
