= Dynamic aperture =

Ultrasound technology

In diagnostic ultrasound, dynamic aperture is the ability to adjust the number of active receive elements as a function of depth to maintain beam width and improve spatial resolution.

The ratio of the light-gathering ability (illuminance) to the aperture size is known as the F-number. Dynamic aperture is keeping this number constant by growing the aperture with the imaging depth until the physical aperture cannot be increased. A modern medical ultrasound machine has a typical F-number of 0.5.

Side Scan Sonar systems produce images by forming angular "beams". Beam width is determined by length of the sonar array, narrower beams resolve finer detail. Longer arrays with narrower beams provide finer spatial resolution.
