= Dielectric reluctance =

Dielectric reluctance is a scalar measurement of a passive dielectric circuit (or element within that circuit) dependent on voltage and electric induction flux, and this is determined by deriving the ratio of their amplitudes. The units of dielectric reluctance are F^{−1} (inverse farads—see daraf) [Ref. 1-3].

$$z_\epsilon = \frac{U}{Q} = \frac{U_m}{Q_m}$$

As seen above, dielectric reluctance is represented as lowercase z epsilon.

For a dielectric in a dielectric circuit to have no energy losses, the imaginary part of its dielectric reluctance is zero. This constitutes a lossless "resistance" to electric induction flux, and is therefore real, not complex. This formality is similar to Ohm's law for a resistive circuit. In dielectric circuits, a dielectric material has a "lossless" dielectric reluctance equal to:

$$z_\epsilon = \frac{1}{\epsilon \epsilon_0}\frac{l}{S}$$

Where:

- $l$ is the circuit length
- $S$ is the cross-section of the circuit element
- $\epsilon \epsilon_0$ is the dielectric permeability

== See also ==
- Dielectric
- Dielectric complex reluctance — General definition of dielectric reluctance that accounts for energy loss
