= David Flower =

British astronomer and physical chemist

David Flower is a British astronomer and physical chemist, an emeritus professor in the Durham University Department of Physics. He was editor in chief of the Monthly Notices of the Royal Astronomical Society (MNRAS) from 2012 to 2026. He is a Fellow of the Royal Astronomical Society, and a Fellow of the Royal Society of Arts.

Flower's research is on the physics and chemistry of the interstellar medium, including atomic and molecular collision physics and astrochemistry. He has authored a book entitled "Molecular Collisions in the Interstellar Medium" which was published in 2007 by Cambridge University Press of the United Kingdom. He has a long list of research published in peer review journals.
