= Douglas P. Verret =

Douglas Verret is the editor in chief of IEEE Transactions on Electron Devices, and was appointed to that position in 2000. He is also member of the American Physical Society. Verret used to be a vice-chairman of the board of the College of Engineering and Computer Science of Baylor University. He has published more than twenty peer-reviewed, scientific articles.

== Education ==
With a chosen field of study in optical properties of metals, Douglas Verret earned an M.S. in Physics from Purdue University, and a PhD in Experimental Solid State Physics from the University of New Orleans.

== Career ==
He taught high school physics and math. Later, at Xavier University, he was an Assistant Professor of Physics and Pre-engineering.

In 1979 he joined Texas Instruments where he participated in producing a novel metal configuration for integrated circuits. In 1983 he became Manager of Bipolar and BiCMOS Development for Texas Instruments. At this time he is the Program Manager for Flash EEPROM development.

His research results, encompassing more than twenty scientific articles, have been published in the Journal of the Optical Society of America, the Transactions on Electron Devices, IEEE Electron Device Letters, the Proceedings of Electron Devices Meeting (IEDM), International and Proceedings of Bipolar/BiCMOS Circuits and Technology Meeting (BCTM)

== Society affiliations ==
He is a member of the American Physical Society, IEEE Electron Devices Society, and Sigma Xi. He is a Texas Instruments Fellow, and an IEEE Fellow.

He became an editor for IEEE Transactions on Electron Devices in 1994 and this publication's editor-in-chief in the year 2000.

Verret is also a member of the IEEE Electron Device Society Publications Committee, and the IEEE TAB Periodicals Committee. At Baylor University he was a member of the board of advocates for the College of Engineering and Computer Science. For the University of Michigan and University of Florida he was a Semiconductor Research Corporation industrial mentor. In 2003 and 2010 he served on the ISQED 2010 Advisory Committee
