= Dai Chuanzeng =

Chinese nuclear physicist

- Born: December 21, 1921; Ningbo, Zhejiang, Republic of China
- Died: November 18, 1990 (aged 68); Beijing, China

Dai Chuanzeng (or Dai Chuanceng, 1921–1990, Chinese: 戴傳曾) was a Chinese nuclear physicist who made fundamental contributions to China's nuclear research and industry.

== Life ==
Dai was born on 21 December 1921 in Dayan Village, Yin County (present Yinzhou District) of Ningbo, Zhejiang province. Dai graduated from the famous Xiaoshi High School (宁波效实中学) in Ningbo. Dai studied physics and graduated, in 1942, from the National Southwestern Associated University (NSAU). Dai taught as an assistant at NSAU, Sun Yat-sen University and Tsinghua University. Dai topped (ranked first out of a total of 400) the Sino-British Boxer Indemnity Scholarship Program.

In 1947, Dai went to study in UK and received PhD from the University of Liverpool (advisor James Chadwick). In the 1950s, Dai went back to China (when Dai was abroad in UK, China already changed its regime from the Republic of China to the newly founded People's Republic of China). Dai was a researcher at the Institute of Modern Physics of the Chinese Academy of Sciences (CAS) in Beijing.

Dai was the Vice-president, President, Honorary-president of the China Institute of Atomic Energy (中国原子能研究院). Dai was a Deputy-director of the State Nuclear Safety and Environmental Control Committee. Dai was a director of the Chinese Nuclear Physics Society (中国核物理学会), an honorary-director of the Chinese Meteorological Society (中国计量学会), and the deputy director-general of the Chinese Nuclear Power Society (中国核动力学会). Dai was a senior academician of the Chinese Academy of Sciences.

Dai died in Beijing on 18 November 1990.

== Merits ==
Dai's early research focused on developing the nuclear detector of high accuracy, which is closely related to his doctoral study. He was a founding father of this field in China.

Dai's team built the first neutron crystal spectrometer, the first neutron diffractometer, the first zero-energy thermal reactor, the first neutron transmutation doping of monocrystalline silicon, first large-sized electromagnetic separator in China.

Dai is the father of the Chinese nuclear micro-reactor.
