= Digital magnetofluidics =

Method to move fluids using magnetic fields

Digital magnetofluidics is a method for moving, combining, splitting, and controlling drops of water or biological fluids using magnetic fields. This is accomplished by adding superparamagnetic particles to a drop placed on a superhydrophobic surface. Normally this type of surface would exhibit a lotus effect and the drop of water would roll or slide off. But by using magnetic fields, the drop is stabilized and its movements and structure can be controlled.
