= Dewbow =

Optical effect caused by dewdrops

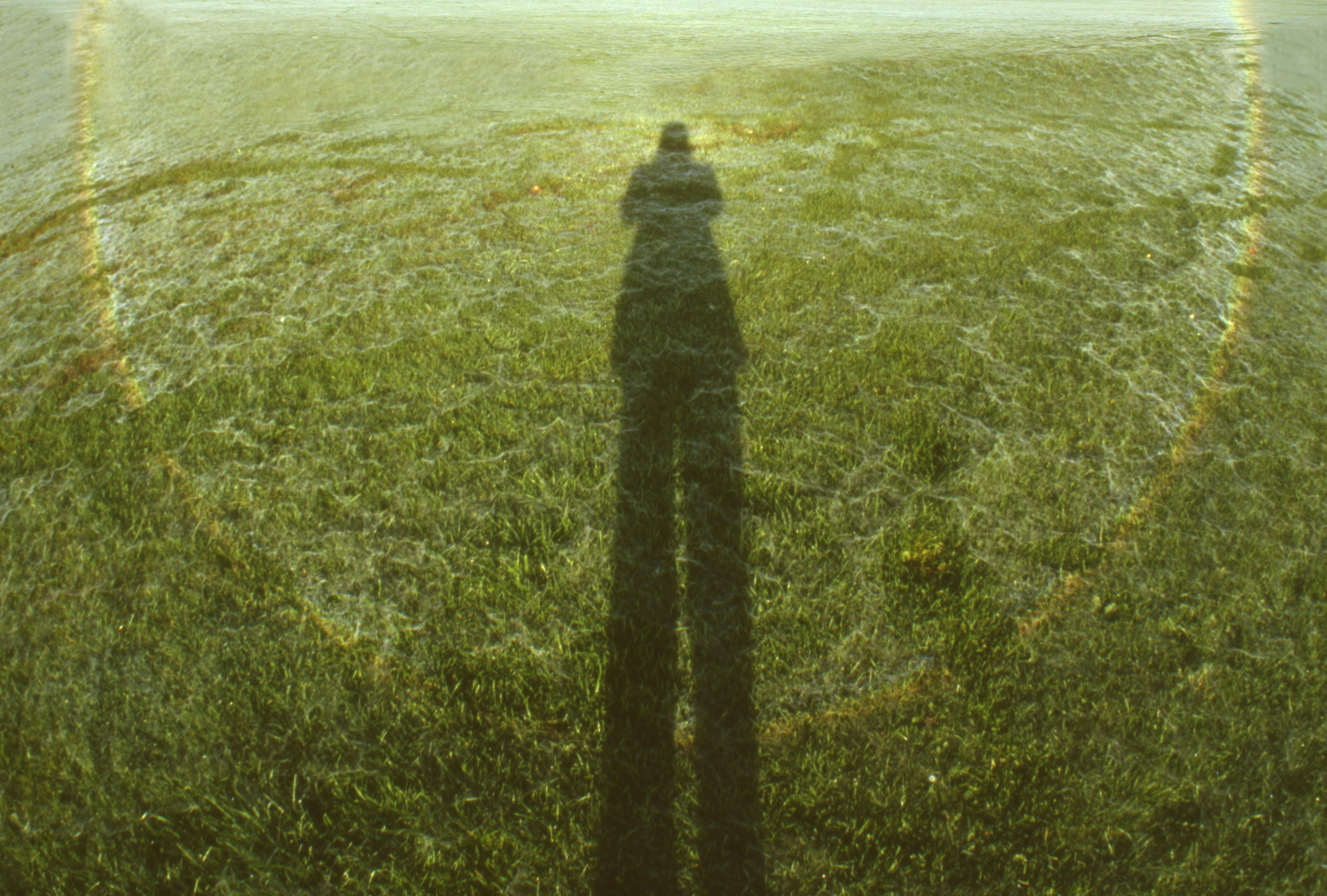
Dewbow around heiligenschein on the ground.

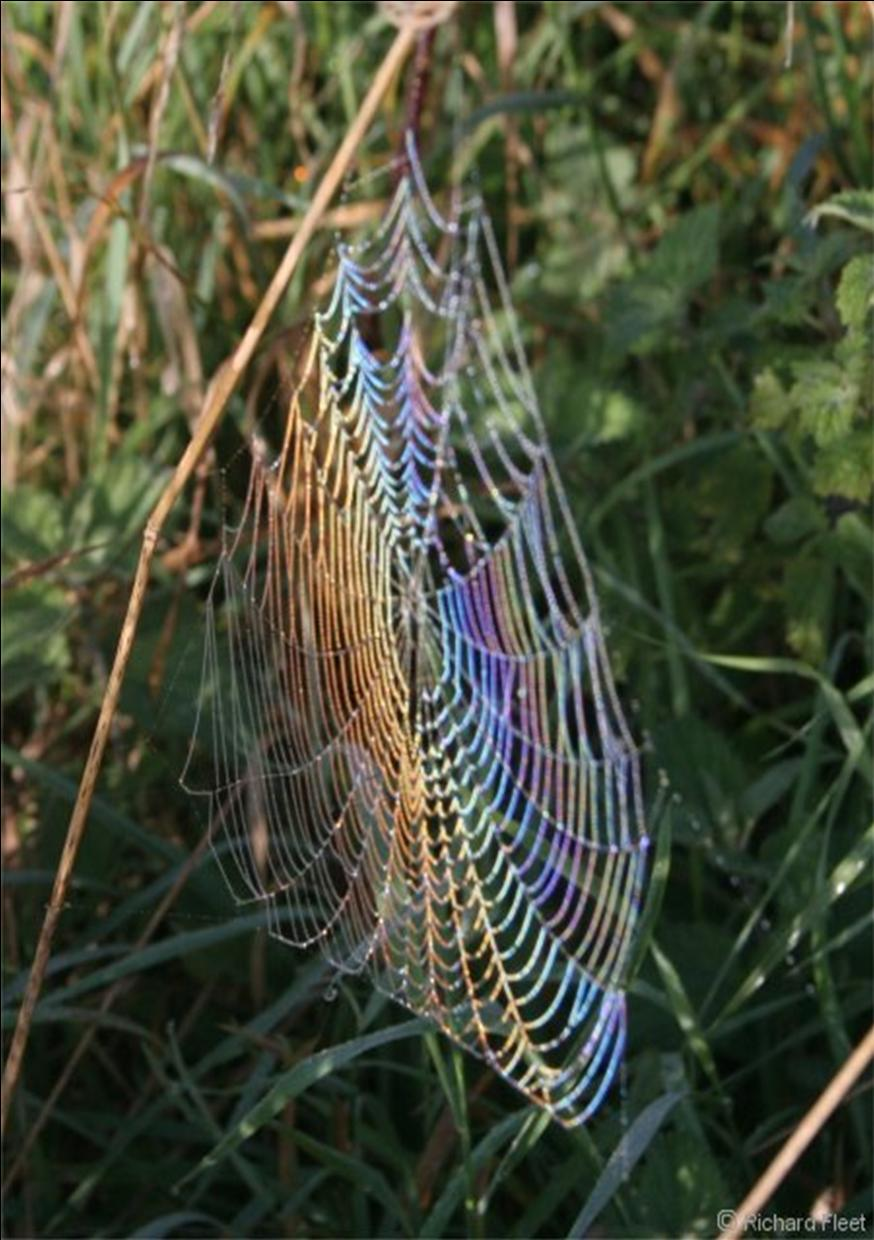
Dewbow on a spiderweb.

A dewbow is an optical effect, similar to a rainbow, where dewdrops instead of rain droplets reflect and disperse sunlight.

== Occurrence ==
Dewbows can be seen on fields covered with dew, when the sun shines. Dew forms outdoors in the early morning after a clear night, when the surface temperature drops below the dew point. It forms most easily on surfaces that are isolated from conducted heat from deep ground, such as grass, leaves, and spider webs. Dew bows will be clearest on fields littered with cobwebs, as may occur in autumn.

== Shape ==
A rainbow is perceived as a circle in the sky; and its contributing light rays form a cone. In contrast, a dewbow is perceived as the intersection of that cone and the ground. If the ground is flat and horizontal, and the sun is low in the sky, the dew bow is a hyperbola. Theoretically, when the sun is high, the intersection might be another conic section, like a parabola or an ellipse. However, dew usually evaporates before the sun is high. Nonetheless, an elliptical dew bow was captured on camera, when at night the full moon, high in the sky, illuminated a field loaded with dew.

== See also ==
- Fogbow
- Moonbow
