= Dember effect =

Phenomenon in physics

In physics, the Dember effect is when the electron current from a cathode $(I_3)$ subjected to both illumination and a simultaneous electron bombardment is greater than the sum of the photoelectric current $(I_1)$ and the secondary emission current $(I_2)$.

== History ==
Discovered by Harry Dember (1882–1943) in 1925, this effect is due to the sum of the excitations of an electron by two means: photonic illumination and electron bombardment (i.e. the sum of the two excitations extracts the electron). In Dember’s initial study, he referred only to metals; however, more complex materials have been analyzed since then.

== Photoelectric effect ==
The photoelectric effect due to the illumination of the metallic surface extracts electrons (if the energy of the photon is greater than the extraction work) and excites the electrons which the photons don’t have the energy to extract.

In a similar process, the electron bombardment of the metal both extracts and excites electrons inside the metal.

$$I_3-I_2-I_1=I_4 \,$$

If one considers $I_1$ a constant and increases $I_2$, it can be observed that $I_4$ has a maximum of about 150 times $I_1$.

On the other hand, considering $I_2$ a constant and increasing the intensity of the illumination $I_2$ the $I_4$, supplementary current, tends to saturate. This is due to the usage in the photoelectric effect of all the electrons excited (sufficiently) by the primary electrons of $I_1$.

== See also ==
- Anomalous photovoltaic effect
- Photo-Dember
