= Dieter Weichert =

German mechanical engineer

Dieter Weichert (born 5 March 1948) is a German mechanical engineer specialising in solid mechanics and polymer rheology. From 1995 to 2013 he was the Director of the Institute for General Mechanics of RWTH Aachen.
