= Gürbüz Doğan Ekşioğlu =

Gürbüz Doğan Ekşioğlu (signs his work as Gürbüz or Gurbuz) is a Turkish cartoonist and graphics designer. He was born in Mesudiye in Ordu Province, Turkey in 1954. He studied graphics at the State College of Fine Arts in Istanbul (named Marmara University Faculty of Fine Arts today) where he is still teaching as an assistant professor. He has been drawing cartoons since 1977 and holds a total of 64 awards (23 of which are international). He participated in many national and international collective displays and also had nine solo exhibitions including one in New York City. His cartoons and illustrations were published in various newspapers and magazines, such as Forbes, The Atlantic, The New York Times, and on five covers of The New Yorker, including the famous one dated 15 September 2003, a special edition for the second anniversary of 11 September 2001 attacks, and the "On the Edge" of the 5 October 2009 issue, which features a signature Ekşioğlu cat motif.
