= Dühring's rule =

Rule in thermodynamics

Dühring's plot for boiling point of NaCl solutions

Dühring's rule is a scientific rule developed by Eugen Dühring which states that a linear relationship exists between the temperatures at which two solutions exert the same vapour pressure. The rule is often used to compare a pure liquid and a solution at a given concentration.

Dühring's plot is a graphical representation of such a relationship, typically with the pure liquid's boiling point along the x-axis and the mixture's boiling point along the y-axis; each line of the graph represents a constant concentration.

== See also ==
- Solubility
- Evaporator
- Raoult's law
