= Detlef Sack =

German political scientist (born 1965)

Detlef Sack was born 1965. He is professor of democracy theory and government system research at Faculty of Political Science, University of Wuppertal.

== Academia ==
Detlef Sack holds the Chair of Comparative Political Science, focusing on comparative research on democratic processes and regimes and analysis of public policy and governance. In 2005 he was a Research fellow at Aston University and was also visiting scholar Aston Business School, Aston University, Birmingham, UK. He was speaker of the Forum of Young Political and Administrational Scientists from 2006 till 2008. Detlef Sack is member of German Association for Political Science (since 2000).

== Research ==
- Indicators of Democracy and Governance. Globalization mechanisms and the production of difference

== Selected publications ==
- 2011 (forthcoming). Dealing with Dissatisfaction – Role, Skills, and Meta-Competences of Participatory Citizenship Education. In Participatory Citizenship Education, eds. R. Hedtke and T. Zimenkova. London: Routledge.
- 2010. Europäisierungsdruck und Parteiendifferenz in deutschen Bundesländern – Die Rechtsprechung des EuGH und die Novellierung von Tariftreueregelungen [Pressure to Europeanization and Differences between Political Parties in the German States – The Jurisdiction of the European Court of Justice and the Amendment of the Regulation on the Observance of Wage Contracts]. Politische Vierteljahresschrift 51(4).
- 2009. Governance und Politics: Die Institutionalisierung öffentlich-privater Partnerschaften in Deutschland [Governance and Politics: Institutionalization of Public-Private Partnerships in Germany]. Baden-Baden: Nomos.
- with U. Thöle, eds. 2008. Soziale Demokratie, die Stadt und das randständige Ich – Dialoge zwischen politischer Theorie und Lebenswelt [Social Democracy, the City, and the Marginal Me – Dialogues Between Political Theory and Real Life]. Kassel: Kassel University Press. *with L. Blume. 2008. Patterns of Social Capital in West German Regions. European Urban and Regional Studies 15(3): 229–248.
- with M. Oppen. 2008. Governance und Performanz: Motive, Formen und Effekte lokaler Public-Private Partnerships [Governance and Performance: Motives, Forms, and Effects of Local Public-Private Partnerships]. In Governance in einer sich wandelnden Welt. PVS-special issue 41, eds. G. F. Schuppert and M. Zürn, 259–281, Wiesbaden: VS Verlag.
- with H.-J. Burchardt. 2008. Multi-Level Governance und demokratische Partizipation – Eine systematische Annäherung. [Multi-level Governance and Democratic Participation – a Systematic Approach]. In Mit mehr Ebenen zu mehr Gestaltung? Multi-Level-Governance in der transnationalen Sozial- und Umweltpolitik, eds. A. Brunnengräber, H.-J. Burchardt, and C. Görg, 41–60. Baden-Baden: Nomos.
- 2008. Das Versprechen und misstrauische „ICHlinge“ – Soziale Demokratie, Pluralismus und Risikoerfahrung [Promises and the Suspicious “Me-Generation“ – Social Democracy, Pluralism, and Risk Experience]. In Soziale Demokratie, die Stadt und das randständige Ich – Dialogue zwischen politischer Theorie und Lebenswelt, eds. D. Sack and U. Thöle, 65–82. Kassel: Kassel University Press.
- with F. Eckardt, and C. Keller. 2008. Les Villes allemandes dans une société ‘nébuleuse’: Comment les réformes politiques de «l’Agenda 2010» répondent aux changements du développement urbain. In Ville, violence et dépendance sociale. Les politiques en Europe, ed. J. Donzelot, 157–182. Paris: PUCA.
- 2006. Gouvernementalität der Partnerschaft: Aspekte einer sozialpolitischen Regierungskunst [Governmentality and Partnership: Aspects of a socio-political Art of Governance]. Zeitschrift für Sozialreform 52(2): 201–216.
