= Dielectric complex reluctance =

Dielectric complex reluctance is a scalar measurement of a passive dielectric circuit (or element within that circuit) dependent on sinusoidal voltage and sinusoidal electric induction flux, and this is determined by deriving the ratio of their complex effective amplitudes. The units of dielectric complex reluctance are $F^{-1}$ (inverse Farads - see Daraf) [Ref. 1-3].

$$Z_\epsilon = \frac{\dot U}{\dot Q} = \frac{\dot {U}_m}{\dot {Q}_m} = z_\epsilon e^{j\phi}$$

As seen above, dielectric complex reluctance is a phasor represented as uppercase Z epsilon where:

$\dot U$ and $\dot {U}_m$ represent the voltage (complex effective amplitude)
$\dot Q$ and $\dot {Q}_m$ represent the electric induction flux (complex effective amplitude)
$z_\epsilon$, lowercase z epsilon, is the real part of dielectric reluctance

The "lossless" dielectric reluctance, lowercase z epsilon, is equal to the absolute value (modulus) of the dielectric complex reluctance. The argument distinguishing the "lossy" dielectric complex reluctance from the "lossless" dielectric reluctance is equal to the natural number $e$ raised to a power equal to:

$$j\phi = j\left(\beta - \alpha\right)$$

Where:

- $j$ is the imaginary unit
- $\beta$ is the phase of voltage
- $\alpha$ is the phase of electric induction flux
- $\phi$ is the phase difference

The "lossy" dielectric complex reluctance represents a dielectric circuit element's resistance to not only electric induction flux but also to changes in electric induction flux. When applied to harmonic regimes, this formality is similar to Ohm's law in ideal AC circuits. In dielectric circuits, a dielectric material has a dielectric complex reluctance equal to:

$$Z_\epsilon = \frac{1}{\dot {\epsilon} \epsilon_0} \frac{l}{S}$$

Where:

- $l$ is the length of the circuit element
- $S$ is the cross-section of the circuit element
- $\dot {\epsilon} \epsilon_0$ is the complex dielectric permeability

== See also ==
- Dielectric
- Dielectric reluctance — Special definition of dielectric reluctance that does not account for energy loss
