= Electron–nuclear dynamics =

Electron–nuclear dynamics (END) covers a set of quantum chemical methods not using the Born-Oppenheimer representation. It considers the motion of the nuclei and the electrons on the same time scales. The method therefore considers the molecular Hamiltonian as a whole without trying to solve separately the Schrödinger equation associated to the electronic molecular Hamiltonian. Though the method is non-adiabatic it is distinguishable from most non-adiabatic methods for treating the molecular dynamics, which typically use the Born-Oppenheimer representation, but become non-adiabatic by considering vibronic coupling explicitly.

Electron–nuclear dynamics is applied in the modelling of high-speed atomic collisions (keV energies and above), where the nuclear motion may be comparable or faster than the electronic motion.

The group of Yngve Öhrn in Gainesville, Florida, has been a pioneer in this field. He applied the method to the collision between two hydrogen atoms.
