= Diffuson =

In condensed matter physics, the diffuson is a disorder-averaged electron-hole propagator, a mathematical object which often appears in the theory of disordered electronic systems. The poles of the propagator can be identified with diffusion modes.

In a disordered system, the motion of an electron is not ballistic, but diffusive: i.e., the electron does not move along a straight line, but experiences a series of random scatterings off of impurities. This random motion (diffusion) is described by a differential equation, known as the diffusion equation. The diffuson is the Green's function of the diffusion equation.

The diffuson plays an important role in the theory of electron transport in disordered systems, especially for phase coherent effects such as universal conductance fluctuations.
