= Dallas Abbott =

American research scientist

Dallas Abbott (born 1963) is a geophysicist and adjunct research scientist at the Lamont–Doherty Earth Observatory of Columbia University and is part of the Holocene Impact Working Group. Her research focuses on submarine impacts, megatsunamis, cosmic dust, and their effects on climate and Earth's geological history. She also has presented research regarding a large impact crater in the Gulf of Maine.

== Education and career ==
Abbott received her B.S. from the Massachusetts Institute of Technology (Earth and Planetary Sciences) in 1974; her M.S. from the Lamont–Doherty Earth Observatory of Columbia University (Marine Geology) in 1978; and her Ph.D. from the Lamont–Doherty Earth Observatory (Marine Geology with a Geophysics minor) in 1982. During her graduate studies, she received the Boris Bakmeteff Fellowship in Fluid Mechanics and the Bruce Heezen Prize.

She held academic positions at Oregon State University and Barnard College. Also, she has been an adjunct research scientist at LDEO of Columbia University since 1996. Since 1990, Abbott has directed or co-directed LDEO's summer undergraduate internship program, which trains students in scientific research methods, technical writing, and data analysis.

She previously served on the editorial board of Precambrian Research and was named a Graduate Fellow of Columbia University.

== Research ==
In 1994, Abbott and colleagues published the first empirical thermal history of Earth's mantle. Prior to their work, most discussions of mantle evolution relied on theoretical models or assumed that Archean komatiites represented the average Archean mantle rather than isolated hotspot regions.

Her research in submarine geology has shown that volcanic arcs contain significantly more active underwater volcanoes than previously recorded in standard databases, as documented in a 2024 study. Abbott has also investigated potential links between submarine impacts and megatsunamis, including dating deposits in southern Madagascar that may have originated from submarine landslides or extraterrestrial impacts. Abbott has studied cosmic dust deposition in Earth’s geological record, identifying tin-rich particles in ice cores and discovering tin-coated pelagic foraminifera in Hudson River sediments—the first documented case of such marine microfossils. This finding was later confirmed in diatoms by her student, Jiahua Wu (2024).

In the field of Precambrian geology, Abbott documented 2.0 billion-year-old native iron in the Chaibasa Formation of India, later interpreted by other researchers as resulting from a meteorite impact. Her work also explored correlations between mantle plume activity and the timing of large impact events during the Precambrian.

Her tectonic research proposed the concept of buoyant subduction around 2.4 billion years ago, which may account for differences in the formation of Archean continental crust.

In climate research, Abbott has examined the 536 AD climate anomaly, attributing its severity to a combination of volcanic activity and cosmic dust deposition.

== Selected publications ==
- Abbott, D. H.; Hoffman, S. E. (1984). "Archaean plate tectonics revisited 1. Heat flow, spreading rate, and the age of subducting oceanic lithosphere and their effects on the origin and evolution of continents". Tectonics. 3 (4): 429–448. doi:10.1029/tc003i004p00429. ISSN 0278-7407.
- Abbott, Dallas; Lyle, Mitchell (1984). "Age of oceanic plates at subduction and volatile recycling". Geophysical Research Letters. 11 (10): 951–954. doi:10.1029/gl011i010p00951. ISSN 0094-8276.
- Abbott, Dallas (1991). "The case for accretion of the tectosphere by buoyant subduction". Geophysical Research Letters. 18 (4): 585–588. doi:10.1029/91gl00813. ISSN 0094-8276.
- Abbott, Dallas H.; Drury, Rebecca; Mooney, Walter D. (1997). "Continents as lithological icebergs: the importance of buoyant lithospheric roots". Earth and Planetary Science Letters. 149 (1–4): 15–27. doi:10.1016/s0012-821x(97)00065-4. ISSN 0012-821X.
- Abbott, Dallas; Sparks, David; Herzberg, Claude; Mooney, Walter; Nikishin, Anatoly; Zhang, Yu Shen (2000). "Quantifying Precambrian crustal extraction: the root is the answer". Tectonophysics. 322 (1–2): 163–190. doi:10.1016/s0040-1951(00)00062-7. ISSN 0040-1951.
- Abbott, Dallas H.; Breger, Dee; Biscaye, Pierre E.; Barron, John A.; Juhl, Robert A.; McCafferty, Patrick (2014), "What caused terrestrial dust loading and climate downturns between A.D. 533 and 540?", Volcanism, Impacts, and Mass Extinctions: Causes and Effects, Geological Society of America, doi:10.1130/2014.2505(23), ISBN 978-0-8137-2505-5
- Abbott, Dallas; Menke, William (1990). <0058:lotgpb>2.3.co;2 "Length of the global plate boundary at 2.4 Ga". Geology. 18 (1): 58. doi:10.1130/0091-7613(1990)018<0058:lotgpb>2.3.co;2. ISSN 0091-7613.
- Abbott, Dallas; Isley, Ann (2001), "Oceanic upwelling and mantle-plume activity: Paleomagnetic tests of ideas on the source of the Fe in early Precambrian iron formations", Mantle plumes: their identification through time, Geological Society of America, ISBN 978-0-8137-2352-5
- Isley, Ann E.; Abbott, Dallas H. (2002). "Implications of the Temporal Distribution of High‐Mg Magmas for Mantle Plume Volcanism through Time". The Journal of Geology. 110 (2): 141–158. doi:10.1086/338553. ISSN 0022-1376.
- Condie, Kent C; Abbott, Dallas; Des Marais, David J (2002). "Preface". Journal of Geodynamics. 34 (2): 159–162. doi:10.1016/s0264-3707(02)00018-2. ISSN 0264-3707.
- Abbott, Dallas H; Isley, Ann E (2002). "The intensity, occurrence, and duration of superplume events and eras over geological time". Journal of Geodynamics. 34 (2): 265–307. doi:10.1016/s0264-3707(02)00024-8. ISSN 0264-3707.
- Abbott, Dallas H; Isley, Ann E (2002). "Extraterrestrial influences on mantle plume activity". Earth and Planetary Science Letters. 205 (1–2): 53–62. doi:10.1016/s0012-821x(02)01013-0. ISSN 0012-821X.
- Abbott, Dallas H; Isley, Ann E (2003-10-30). "Reply to Comment on 'Extraterrestrial influences on mantle plume activity' by Andrew Glikson". Earth and Planetary Science Letters. 215 (3–4): 429–432. doi:10.1016/s0012-821x(03)00459-x. ISSN 0012-821X.

== See also ==
- Chevron (land form)
