= Daniel Chonghan Hong =

Korean-American theoretical physicist (1956–2002)

- Born: March 3, 1956
- Died: July 6, 2002 (aged 46)
- Education: Seoul National University; Boston University
- Known for: Popcorn Granular material
- Scientific career
- Fields: Physicist
- Workplaces: Lehigh University

Daniel Chonghan Hong (March 3, 1956 – July 6, 2002) was a Korean-American theoretical physicist.

Hong was born in Seoul. He studied physics at the Seoul National University. In 1979, he received his bachelor's degree there, and in 1981 his master's degree. Afterwards, he started his doctorate studies at Boston University, which he finished in 1985 with a Ph.D. After that, he got a postdoc research position at the University of California, Santa Barbara, and later another position at the Emory University. In 1988, he became an assistant professor at the physics department of the Lehigh University. In 1994, he became an associate professor, and in 2000 a full professor.

He was interested in the dynamics of granular matter and researched on the granular flow, diffusion models, viscosity behavior and percolation, among other subjects. The void diffusion model, developed by Hong and a Lehigh colleague, is widely recognized as an effective theoretical model for treating a broad range of dynamical phenomena in granular media.

His formal treatment of the physics of the popcorn-making process was extremely popular and enjoyed attention from both the physics community and the lay public. He actively engaged broader audiences by writing popular magazine articles on varied topics ranging from science to philosophy to religion. He had collaborations going with numerous theorists all over the world.

From 1995 to 2000, he was editor of the AKPA Newsletter and belonged to the editors board of the KASTN, the Korean American Science and Technology News.

He died on July 6, 2002, aged 46.
