= Detlev F. Neufert =

German film director

Detlev F. Neufert is a German author, filmmaker, photographer and current president of the German Thai Media Association.

Neufert studied philosophy, German literature and theology before becoming a film director of features and documentaries (including short films on Bob Dylan, Frank Zappa and Patti Smith) for German television. His film "Take away the night " premièred at the 1982 Cannes Film Festival. In 1985–86, Neufert held a lectureship for German film at the University of California, Santa Barbara. Neufert is also known for his work for the Süddeutsche Zeitung, one of Germany's leading newspapers, and for German television channels ARD and ZDF. He is also a book author (f.e. "Isan, My Love", and "1968 or Angel, Fly"). In 1998 he became the deputy president of the German art party Chance 2000 founded by Christoph Schlingensief.

2005 he founded the Christliche Internationale. Neufert works and lives in Berlin and Bangkok.

== Selected bibliography ==
" Nat Han. A true story in an untrue world." epubli Verlag www.epubli.com, 2014, ISBN 9783737511469

- Politiker: auf der Suche nach den Deutschen. Bonn: Bouvier, 1994.
- 1968 oder Engel flieg! Freiburg: Lautsprecher Verlag, Stuttgart 2001
- Isan, my love Berlin: Paleo Books, Berlin 2003

== Selected filmography ==
- Take away the night feature film, 1982
- Heavens Meadow. The small wonders of Baan Gerda documentary, 2005
- Tong fights - winning heaven documentary, 2006
- Die Himmelswiese. Die kleine Wunder von Baan Gerda 2007 90min. Thailand, Aids, Waisenkinder,
- Sabai,sabai Deutschland 38, min. Goethe Institut Bangkok
- The children of Ferdi Home 68 min. 2017 Myanmar Foundation Myanmar, Nagaland, Yangon, Bagan.
- Die Kinder von Ferdi Home 68 min. 2017 Myanmar Stiftung Myanmar, Burma, Yangon, Bagan
- B.B. and the school by the river 108 min., 2020German Myanmar Media Association, Nachtflugfilm, Nagaland, Burma, Myanmar, Bagan, Homalin, Thamandi
- B.B. und die Schule am Fluss108 min., 2020German Myanmar Media Association, Nachtflugfilm, Nagaland, Burma, Myanmar, Bagan, Homalin, Thamandi

== Sources and references ==
- Website von Detlev F. Neufert
- Unser Manifest Christliche Internationale
- [[]]}
- Sabai, Sabai Deutschland - Goethe-Institut Thailand Sabai, sabai DeutschlandThailänder in Deutschland
- Sabai, Sabai Deutschland -
- Fresh Familee Comin from Ratinga - YouTubeFresh Family - Comin' from Ratinga Erster deutscher Rap - Film
- - YouTube Macht und Bescheidenheit. F.W. Christians - ein deutscher Banker Deutsche Bank
- - YouTube Kein Knast für Kids
- Wanderjahre oder die Seele des Trommlers - Frank Köllges. Ein Film von Detlev F. Neufert - YouTube Wanderjahre oder die Seele des Trommlers - Frank Köllges
- - YouTube Die Kinder von Ferdi Home Trailer
- CEO WANTED TRAILER - YouTube CEO WANTED Trailer 'Die Himmelswiese. Die kleinen Wunder von Baan Gerda.]
- {Glück gefunden | Sabai, Sabai Deutschland - YouTube Sabai,sabai Deutschland - Glück gefunden
- Traum und Wirklichkeit | Sabai, Sabai Deutschland - YouTube Sabai, sabai Deutschland - Traum und Wirklichkeit
- Ankommen| Sabai, Sabai Deutschland - YouTube Sabai,sabai Deutschland - Ankommen
- Thai bleiben | Sabai, Sabai Deutschland - YouTube Sabai,sabai Deutschland - Thai bleiben
- Tempelfest und Thaipark in Berlin | Sabai, Sabai Deutschland - YouTube Sabai,sabai Deutschland - Trailer
- Detlev F. Neufert - Lesung - Jesus im Löwenpalais Berlin 2015 - YouTube Jesus. Das Interview. Neues vom Auferstandenen. Lesung Berlin Löwenpalais
- - YouTube Hier zu leben, ist eine Schule für sich. Afrikaner in Deutschland
- THE CHILDREN OF FERDI HOME IN BAGAN. - YouTube Train to Bagan The children of Ferdi Home
- Telefon Sex Interview mit Call Sex Girl Elisabeth in "Tagesgespräch" - YouTube ARD Tagesgespräch - Telefon Sex
- Köllges und Kling: waldstück mit helikopter (vmtl. frühe 90er; aus: geschmacksverstärker, 1989) - YouTube Thomas Kling: brennstab & rauchmelder. Ein Dichter aus Deutschland. Auszug
