= Meteorological & Geoastrophysical Abstracts =

Bibliographic database

Meteorological and Geoastrophysical Abstracts
- Producer: American Meteorological Society
- Languages: English

Access
- Providers: Dialog, ProQuest
- Cost: Subscription

Coverage
- Disciplines: Meteorology, Geophysics, Astrophysics
- Record depth: Index & Abstract
- Format coverage: journal articles, conference proceedings, technical reports, books, monographs
- Temporal coverage: 1974 – present
- Geospatial coverage: Global
- No. of records: 508,379
- Update frequency: Monthly

Links
- Website: about.proquest.com/en/products-services/meteorological--geoastrophysical-abstracts/

Meteorological & Geoastrophysical Abstracts is a scholarly bibliographic database that covers meteorology, climatology, atmospheric chemistry and physics, astrophysics, hydrology, glaciology, physical oceanography and environmental sciences.

== Production and Access ==
The database is produced by the American Meteorological Society, and is published by DIALOG and Cambridge Scientific Abstracts.

== Coverage ==
The database has over 508,379 records as of November 2009, and covers literature published 1974–present. Every month approximately 850 new records are added. In a 2002 analysis of the database, it was revealed that MGA indexed 72 unique titles, eight of which were peer reviewed.
