= Denaturation (fissile materials) =

Denaturation of fissile materials suitable for nuclear weapons is the process of transforming them into a form that is not suitable for weapons use and can not easily be reversely transformed. For uranium 235 this is straightforward, by mixing it with uranium 238, but for plutonium it is more difficult and/or less effective, because other plutonium isotopes are either also suitable for weapons or not available and impractical to produce, while mixing with a different element allows chemical separation.

The situation with uranium-233 is more complicated, as U-233 is difficult to store safely, which is both an advantage and a disadvantage. Decay of the associated uranium-232 produces thorium-228 with a radioactive half-life of 1.9 years and several short-lived daughter nuclides; these daughters include some very hard gamma-ray emitters like thallium-208 and lead-212. After approximately one year, the alpha activity of these decay products is several hundred curies per kilogram of U-233, and the penetrating gamma radiation is a thousand times greater than that from plutonium. Aged U-233 is thus radiologically self-protected from all but the most determined misuse.
