= Demetrius Hondros =

Greek physicist (1882–1962)

Demetrius Hondros (Greek: Δημήτριος Χόνδρος, 9/21 April 1882 in Serres – 29 July 1962, Athens) was a Greek physicist. He was born in April 1882 in what was then the Ottoman Empire.

Hondros studied under Arnold Sommerfeld at the Ludwig-Maximilians-Universität München, and was granted his Ph.D. in 1909. In 1922, he was cited as being professor of physics at the University of Athens.

== Notes ==
- http://www.physics.ntua.gr/~dris/DIDAKTO_D-H.pdf
