= Detlev Ploog =

German psychiatrist

Detlev Ploog (29 November 1920, Hamburg – 7 December 2005, Munich) was a German clinical psychiatrist, primate behavior researcher and anthropologist. He was a soldier in the Second World War, received his medical doctorate from Marburg University in 1945, was a director of the Max Planck Institute for Psychiatry and a professor at the Ludwig-Maximilians-Universität München.

Ploog received the German Order of Merit in 1980.
