= Detlef Quadfasel =

German geophysicist

Detlef Rudolf Quadfasel is a professor of Geophysics at Niels Bohr Institute for Astronomy, Physics and Geophysics at Copenhagen University and Oceanography at the Institut für Meereskunde, Hamburg. He is joint editor of Progress in Oceanography. He is involved in a number of projects, including Climate monitoring - Greenland Sea Convection.
