= Doğan Abukay =

Turkish physicist

- Education: Middle East Technical University (B.Sc.); Clarkson College of Technology (M.Sc.); Ege University (Ph.D.)
- Scientific career
- Fields: Physics
- Workplaces: Izmir Institute of Technology

Doğan Abukay is a Turkish experimental physicist and retired professor of Physics at the Izmir Institute of Technology His research areas include Applied Physics, Superconductivity, High Temperature Superconductors, Thin Film Growth, Josephson Junctions, SQUIDs and applications.

== Publications ==
- Complete list at Google Scholar
- Click for the complete list of publications
