= Superfluid vacuum theory =

Theory of fundamental physics

Superfluid vacuum theory (SVT), sometimes known as the BEC vacuum theory, is an approach in theoretical physics and quantum mechanics where the fundamental physical vacuum (non-removable background) is considered as a superfluid or as a Bose–Einstein condensate (BEC).

The microscopic structure of this physical vacuum is currently unknown and is a subject of intensive studies in SVT. An ultimate goal of this research is to develop scientific models that unify quantum mechanics (which describes three of the four known fundamental interactions) with gravity, making SVT a derivative of quantum gravity and describes all known interactions in the Universe, at both microscopic and astronomic scales, as different manifestations of the same entity, superfluid vacuum.

== History ==
The concept of a luminiferous aether as a medium sustaining electromagnetic waves was discarded after the advent of the special theory of relativity, as the presence of the concept alongside special relativity results in several contradictions; in particular, aether having a definite velocity at each spacetime point will exhibit a preferred direction. This conflicts with the relativistic requirement that all directions within a light cone are equivalent. However, as early as in 1951 P.A.M. Dirac published two papers where he pointed out that we should take into account quantum fluctuations in the flow of the aether. His arguments involve the application of the uncertainty principle to the velocity of aether at any spacetime point, implying that the velocity will not be a well-defined quantity. In fact, it will be distributed over various possible values. At best, one could represent the aether by a wave function representing the perfect vacuum state for which all aether velocities are equally probable.

Inspired by Dirac's ideas, K. P. Sinha, C. Sivaram and E. C. G. Sudarshan published in 1975 a series of papers that suggested a new model for the aether according to which it is a superfluid state of fermion and anti-fermion pairs, describable by a macroscopic wave function. They noted that particle-like small fluctuations of superfluid background obey the Lorentz symmetry, even if the superfluid itself is non-relativistic. Nevertheless, they decided to treat the superfluid as the relativistic matter – by putting it into the stress–energy tensor of the Einstein field equations. This did not allow them to describe the relativistic gravity as a small fluctuation of the superfluid vacuum, as subsequent authors have noted.

Since then, several theories have been proposed within the SVT framework. They differ in how the structure and properties of the background superfluid must look. In absence of observational data which would rule out some of them, these theories are being pursued independently.

== Relation to other concepts and theories ==
=== Lorentz and Galilean symmetries ===
According to the approach, the background superfluid is assumed to be essentially non-relativistic whereas the Lorentz symmetry is not an exact symmetry of Nature but rather the approximate description valid only for small fluctuations. An observer who resides inside such vacuum and is capable of creating or measuring the small fluctuations would observe them as relativistic objects – unless their energy and momentum are sufficiently high to make the Lorentz-breaking corrections detectable. If the energies and momenta are below the excitation threshold then the superfluid background behaves like the ideal fluid, therefore, the Michelson–Morley-type experiments would observe no drag force from such aether.

Further, in the theory of relativity the Galilean symmetry (pertinent to our macroscopic non-relativistic world) arises as the approximate one – when particles' velocities are small compared to speed of light in vacuum. In SVT one does not need to go through Lorentz symmetry to obtain the Galilean one – the dispersion relations of most non-relativistic superfluids are known to obey the non-relativistic behavior at large momenta.

To summarize, the fluctuations of vacuum superfluid behave like relativistic objects at "small" (Note: The term "small" refers here to the linearized limit, in practice the values of these momenta may not be small at all.) momenta (a.k.a. the "phononic limit")

$$E^2 \propto |\vec p|^2$$

and like non-relativistic ones

$$E \propto |\vec p|^2$$

at large momenta. The yet unknown nontrivial physics is believed to be located somewhere between these two regimes.

=== Relativistic quantum field theory ===
In the relativistic quantum field theory the physical vacuum is also assumed to be some sort of non-trivial medium to which one can associate certain energy. This is because the concept of absolutely empty space (or "mathematical vacuum") contradicts the postulates of quantum mechanics. According to QFT, even in absence of real particles the background is always filled by pairs of creating and annihilating virtual particles. However, a direct attempt to describe such medium leads to the so-called ultraviolet divergences. In some QFT models, such as quantum electrodynamics, these problems can be "solved" using the renormalization technique, namely, replacing the diverging physical values by their experimentally measured values. In other theories, such as the quantum general relativity, this trick does not work, and reliable perturbation theory cannot be constructed.

According to SVT, this is because in the high-energy ("ultraviolet") regime the Lorentz symmetry starts failing so dependent theories cannot be regarded valid for all scales of energies and momenta. Correspondingly, while the Lorentz-symmetric quantum field models are obviously a good approximation below the vacuum-energy threshold, in its close vicinity the relativistic description becomes more and more "effective" and less and less natural since one will need to adjust the expressions for the covariant field-theoretical actions by hand.

=== Curved spacetime ===
According to general relativity, gravitational interaction is described in terms of spacetime curvature using the mathematical formalism of differential geometry. This was supported by numerous experiments and observations in the regime of low energies. However, the attempts to quantize general relativity led to various severe problems, therefore, the microscopic structure of gravity is still ill-defined. There may be a fundamental reason for this—the degrees of freedom of general relativity are based on what may be only approximate and effective. The question of whether general relativity is an effective theory has been raised for a long time.

According to SVT, the curved spacetime arises as the small-amplitude collective excitation mode of the non-relativistic background condensate. The mathematical description of this is similar to fluid-gravity analogy which is being used also in the analog gravity models. Thus, relativistic gravity is essentially a long-wavelength theory of the collective modes whose amplitude is small compared to the background one. Outside this requirement the curved-space description of gravity in terms of the Riemannian geometry becomes incomplete or ill-defined.

=== Cosmological constant ===
The notion of the cosmological constant makes sense in a relativistic theory only, therefore, within the SVT framework this constant can refer at most to the energy of small fluctuations of the vacuum above a background value, but not to the energy of the vacuum itself. Thus, in SVT this constant does not have any fundamental physical meaning, and related problems such as the vacuum catastrophe, simply do not occur in the first place.

=== Gravitational waves and gravitons ===
According to general relativity, the conventional gravitational wave is:

1. the small fluctuation of curved spacetime which
2. has been separated from its source and propagates independently.

Superfluid vacuum theory brings into question the possibility that a relativistic object possessing both of these properties exists in nature. Indeed, according to the approach, the curved spacetime itself is the small collective excitation of the superfluid background, therefore, the property (1) means that the graviton would be in fact the "small fluctuation of the small fluctuation", which does not look like a physically robust concept (as if somebody tried to introduce small fluctuations inside a phonon, for instance). As a result, it may be not just a coincidence that in general relativity the gravitational field alone has no well-defined stress–energy tensor, only the pseudotensor one. Therefore, the property (2) cannot be completely justified in a theory with exact Lorentz symmetry which the general relativity is. Though, SVT does not a priori forbid an existence of the non-localized wave-like excitations of the superfluid background which might be responsible for the astrophysical phenomena which are currently being attributed to gravitational waves, such as the Hulse–Taylor binary. However, such excitations cannot be correctly described within the framework of a fully relativistic theory.

=== Mass generation and Higgs boson ===
The Higgs boson is the spin-0 particle that has been introduced in electroweak theory to give mass to the weak bosons. The origin of mass of the Higgs boson itself is not explained by electroweak theory. Instead, this mass is introduced as a free parameter by means of the Higgs potential, which thus makes it yet another free parameter of the Standard Model. Within the framework of the Standard Model (or its extensions) the theoretical estimates of this parameter's value are possible only indirectly and results differ from each other significantly. Thus, the usage of the Higgs boson (or any other elementary particle with predefined mass) alone is not the most fundamental solution of the mass generation problem but only its reformulation ad infinitum. Another known issue of the Glashow–Weinberg–Salam model is the wrong sign of mass term in the (unbroken) Higgs sector for energies above the symmetry-breaking scale. (Note: If one expands the Higgs potential then the coefficient at the quadratic term appears to be negative. This coefficient has a physical meaning of squared mass of a scalar particle.)

While SVT does not explicitly forbid the existence of the electroweak Higgs particle, it has its own idea of the fundamental mass generation mechanism – elementary particles acquire mass due to the interaction with the vacuum condensate, similarly to the gap generation mechanism in superconductors or superfluids. Although this idea is not entirely new, one could recall the relativistic Coleman-Weinberg approach, SVT gives the meaning to the symmetry-breaking relativistic scalar field as describing small fluctuations of background superfluid which can be interpreted as an elementary particle only under certain conditions. In general, one allows two scenarios to happen:

- Higgs boson exists: in this case SVT provides the mass generation mechanism which underlies the electroweak one and explains the origin of mass of the Higgs boson itself;
- Higgs boson does not exist: then the weak bosons acquire mass by directly interacting with the vacuum condensate.

Thus, the Higgs boson, even if it exists, would be a by-product of the fundamental mass generation phenomenon rather than its cause.

Also, some versions of SVT favor a wave equation based on the logarithmic potential rather than on the quartic one. The former potential has not only the Mexican-hat shape, necessary for the spontaneous symmetry breaking, but also some other features which make it more suitable for the vacuum's description.

== Logarithmic BEC vacuum theory ==
In this model the physical vacuum is conjectured to be strongly-correlated quantum Bose liquid whose ground-state wavefunction is described by the logarithmic Schrödinger equation. It was shown that the relativistic gravitational interaction arises as the small-amplitude collective excitation mode whereas relativistic elementary particles can be described by the particle-like modes in the limit of low energies and momenta. The essential difference of this theory from others is that in the logarithmic superfluid the maximal velocity of fluctuations is constant in the leading (classical) order. This allows to fully recover the relativity postulates in the "phononic" (linearized) limit.

The proposed theory has many observational consequences. They are based on the fact that at high energies and momenta the behavior of the particle-like modes eventually becomes distinct from the relativistic one – they can reach the speed of light limit at finite energy. Among other predicted effects is the superluminal propagation and vacuum Cherenkov radiation.

Theory advocates the mass generation mechanism which is supposed to replace or alter the electroweak Higgs one. It was shown that masses of elementary particles can arise as a result of interaction with the superfluid vacuum, similarly to the gap generation mechanism in superconductors. For instance, the photon propagating in the average interstellar vacuum acquires a tiny mass which is estimated to be about 10^{−35} electronvolt. One can also derive an effective potential for the Higgs sector which is different from the one used in the Glashow–Weinberg–Salam model, yet it yields the mass generation and it is free of the imaginary-mass problem appearing in the conventional Higgs potential.

== See also ==
- Analog models of gravity
- Acoustic metric
- Casimir effect
- Dilatonic quantum gravity
- Hawking radiation
- Induced gravity
- Logarithmic Schrödinger equation
- Hořava–Lifshitz gravity
- Sonic black hole
- Vacuum energy
- Hydrodynamic quantum analogs
- Fluid solution
- Vacuum solution
