= Induced gravity =

Idea in quantum gravity

Induced gravity (or emergent gravity) is an idea in quantum gravity that spacetime curvature and its dynamics emerge as a mean field approximation of underlying microscopic degrees of freedom, similar to the fluid mechanics approximation of Bose–Einstein condensates. The concept was originally proposed by Andrei Sakharov in 1967.

== Overview ==
Sakharov observed that many condensed matter systems give rise to emergent phenomena that are analogous to general relativity. For example, crystal defects can look like curvature and torsion in an Einstein–Cartan spacetime. This allows one to create a theory of gravity with torsion from a world crystal model of spacetime in which the lattice spacing is of the order of a Planck length. Sakharov's idea was to start with an arbitrary background pseudo-Riemannian manifold (in modern treatments, possibly with torsion) and introduce quantum fields (matter) on it but not introduce any gravitational dynamics explicitly. This gives rise to an effective action which to one-loop order contains the Einstein–Hilbert action with a cosmological constant. In other words, general relativity arises as an emergent property of matter fields and is not put in by hand. On the other hand, such models typically predict huge cosmological constants.

Some argue that the particular models proposed by Sakharov and others have been proven impossible by the Weinberg–Witten theorem.

However, models with emergent gravity are possible as long as other things, such as spacetime dimensions, emerge together with gravity. Developments in AdS/CFT correspondence after 1997 suggest that the microphysical degrees of freedom in induced gravity might be radically different. The bulk spacetime arises as an emergent phenomenon of the quantum degrees of freedom that are entangled and live in the boundary of the spacetime.

According to some prominent researchers in emergent gravity (such as Mark Van Raamsdonk) spacetime is built up of quantum entanglement. This implies that quantum entanglement is the fundamental property that gives rise to spacetime. In 1995, Theodore Jacobson showed that the Einstein field equations can be derived from the first law of thermodynamics applied at local Rindler horizons. Thanu Padmanabhan and Erik Verlinde explore links between gravity and entropy, Verlinde being known for an entropic gravity proposal. The Einstein equation for gravity can emerge from the entanglement first law. In the "quantum graphity" proposal of Konopka, Markopoulu-Kalamara, Severini and Smolin, the fundamental degrees of freedom exist on a dynamical graph that is initially complete, and an effective spatial lattice structure emerges in the low-temperature limit.

== See also ==
- Black hole thermodynamics
- Entropic force
- Entropic gravity
- List of quantum gravity researchers
- Superfluid vacuum theory
- Einstein–Cartan theory
