= Extremal black hole =

Scientific theory

The ergosphere, outer horizon, and inner horizon of a Kerr black hole as its spin approaches extremal values (a=1).

In theoretical physics, an extremal black hole is a black hole with the minimum possible mass that is compatible with its charge and angular momentum. Extremal black holes have zero temperature. Near-extremal black holes with mass slightly above the extremal value have a simple horizon structure that make them valuable tools for black hole research.

The concept of an extremal black hole is hypothetical, and none have thus far been observed in nature. However, they have proven useful as theoretical constructs.

== Theorized characteristics ==
Theoretically, extremal black holes would have zero Hawking temperature and emit no Hawking radiation. In supersymmetric theories, extremal black holes are often supersymmetric: they are invariant under several supercharges. This is a consequence of the BPS bound. Their black hole entropy can be calculated in string theory.

One proposal, known as the "third law of black hole thermodynamics", says that no physical process can form a black hole with vanishing surface gravity. This would disallow the formation of an extremal black hole; more specifically, no process involving a finite number of steps could produce a black hole without violating the weak energy condition. A proof of this was published in 1986 by Werner Israel. However, more recent work claims it contains an error and therefore extremal black holes are indeed possible. The third law of thermodynamics for black holes has always been controversial.

== Near-extremal black holes ==
A black hole whose mass is not far from the minimal possible mass that can be compatible with the given charges and angular momentum is known as a near-extremal black hole. Calculations regarding these bodies are usually performed using perturbation theory around the extremal black hole; the expansion parameter is called non-extremality. In supersymmetric theories, near-extremal black holes are often small perturbations of supersymmetric black holes. Such black holes have a very small Hawking temperature and consequently emit a small amount of Hawking radiation. Their entropy can often be calculated in string theory, much like in the case of extremal black holes, at least to the first order in non-extremality.

== See also ==
- Black hole information paradox
- Quantum gravity
- Trans-Planckian problem
- Positive energy theorem
