= Emergent gravity =

Emergent gravity may refer to

- Induced gravity, a theory proposed by Andrei Sakharov in 1967,
- Entropic gravity, a theory proposed by Erik Verlinde in 2009.
