= Micro black hole =

Hypothetical black holes of very small size

Micro black holes, also known as mini black holes and quantum mechanical black holes, are hypothetical tiny (<1 M_{☉}) black holes, for which quantum mechanical effects play an important role. The concept that black holes may exist that are smaller than stellar mass was introduced in 1971 by Stephen Hawking.

It is possible that such black holes were created in the high-density environment of the early universe (or Big Bang), or possibly through subsequent phase transitions (referred to as primordial black holes). They might be possible to observe through the particles they are expected to emit by Hawking radiation.

Some hypotheses involving additional space dimensions predict that micro black holes could be formed at energies as low as the teraelectronvolt (TeV) range, which are available in particle accelerators such as the Large Hadron Collider. Popular concerns have then been raised over end-of-the-world scenarios (see Safety of particle collisions at the Large Hadron Collider). However, such quantum black holes would instantly evaporate, either totally or leaving only a very weakly interacting residue. Beside the theoretical arguments, cosmic rays hitting the Earth do not produce any damage, although they reach energies in the range of hundreds of TeV.

== Minimum mass of a black hole ==
In an early speculation, Stephen Hawking conjectured that a black hole would not form with a mass below about 10^{−8} kg (roughly the Planck mass). To make a black hole, one must concentrate mass or energy sufficiently that the escape velocity from the region in which it is concentrated exceeds the speed of light.

Some extensions of present physics posit the existence of extra dimensions of space. In higher-dimensional spacetime, the strength of gravity increases more rapidly with decreasing distance than in three dimensions. With certain special configurations of the extra dimensions, this effect can lower the Planck scale to the TeV range. Examples of such extensions include large extra dimensions, special cases of the Randall–Sundrum model, and string theory configurations like the GKP solutions. In such scenarios, black hole production could possibly be an important and observable effect at the Large Hadron Collider (LHC). It would also be a common natural phenomenon induced by cosmic rays.

All this assumes that the theory of general relativity remains valid at these small distances. If it does not, then other, currently unknown, effects might limit the minimum size of a black hole. Elementary particles are equipped with a quantum-mechanical, intrinsic angular momentum (spin). The correct conservation law for the total (orbital plus spin) angular momentum of matter in curved spacetime requires that spacetime is equipped with torsion. The simplest and most natural theory of gravity with torsion is the Einstein–Cartan theory. Torsion modifies the Dirac equation in the presence of the gravitational field and causes fermion particles to be spatially extended. In this case the spatial extension of fermions limits the minimum mass of a black hole to be on the order of 10^{16} kg, showing that micro black holes may not exist. The energy necessary to produce such a black hole is 39 orders of magnitude greater than the energies available at the Large Hadron Collider, indicating that the LHC cannot produce mini black holes. But if black holes are produced, then the theory of general relativity is proven wrong and does not exist at these small distances. The rules of general relativity would be broken, as is consistent with theories of how matter, space, and time break down around the event horizon of a black hole. This would prove the spatial extensions of the fermion limits to be incorrect as well. The fermion limits assume a minimum mass needed to sustain a black hole, as opposed to the opposite, the minimum mass needed to start a black hole, which in theory is achievable in the LHC under some conditions.

== Stability ==
=== Hawking radiation ===
In 1975, Stephen Hawking argued that, due to quantum effects, black holes "evaporate" by a process now referred to as Hawking radiation in which elementary particles (such as photons, electrons, quarks and gluons) are emitted. His calculations showed that the smaller the size of the black hole, the faster the evaporation rate, resulting in a sudden burst of particles as the micro black hole suddenly explodes.

Any primordial black hole of sufficiently low mass will evaporate to near the Planck mass within the lifetime of the Universe. In this process, these small black holes radiate away matter. A rough picture of this is that pairs of virtual particles emerge from the vacuum near the event horizon, with one member of a pair being captured, and the other escaping the vicinity of the black hole. The net result is the black hole loses mass (due to conservation of energy). According to the formulae of black hole thermodynamics, the more the black hole loses mass, the hotter it becomes, and the faster it evaporates, until it approaches the Planck mass. At this stage, a black hole would have a Hawking temperature of T_{P}/8π (5.6×10^{30} K), which means an emitted Hawking particle would have an energy comparable to the mass of the black hole. Thus, a thermodynamic description breaks down. Such a micro black hole would also have an entropy of only 4π nats, approximately the minimum possible value. At this point then, the object can no longer be described as a classical black hole, and Hawking's calculations also break down.

While Hawking radiation is sometimes questioned, Leonard Susskind summarizes an expert perspective in his book The Black Hole War: "Every so often, a physics paper will appear claiming that black holes don't evaporate. Such papers quickly disappear into the infinite junk heap of fringe ideas."

=== Conjectures for the final state ===
Conjectures for the final fate of the black hole include total evaporation and production of a Planck-mass-sized black hole remnant. Such Planck-mass black holes may in effect be stable objects if the quantized gaps between their allowed energy levels bar them from emitting Hawking particles or absorbing energy gravitationally like a classical black hole. In such case, they would be weakly interacting massive particles; this could explain dark matter.

== Primordial black holes ==
=== Formation in the early Universe ===
Production of a black hole requires concentration of mass or energy within the corresponding Schwarzschild radius. It was hypothesized by Zel'dovich and Novikov first and independently by Hawking that, shortly after the Big Bang, the Universe was dense enough for any given region of space to fit within its own Schwarzschild radius. Even so, at that time, the Universe was not able to collapse into a singularity due to its uniform mass distribution and rapid growth. This, however, does not fully exclude the possibility that black holes of various sizes may have emerged locally. A black hole formed in this way is called a primordial black hole and is the most widely accepted hypothesis for the possible creation of micro black holes. Computer simulations suggest that the probability of formation of a primordial black hole is inversely proportional to its mass. Thus, the most likely outcome would be micro black holes.

=== Expected observable effects ===
A primordial black hole with an initial mass of around 10^{12} kg would be completing its evaporation today; a less massive primordial black hole would have already evaporated. Under optimal conditions, the Fermi Gamma-ray Space Telescope satellite, launched in June 2008, might detect experimental evidence for evaporation of nearby black holes by observing gamma ray bursts. It is unlikely that a collision between a microscopic black hole and an object such as a star or a planet would be noticeable. The small radius and high density of the black hole would allow it to pass straight through any object consisting of normal atoms, interacting with only a few of its atoms while doing so. It has, however, been suggested that a small black hole of sufficient mass passing through the Earth would produce a detectable acoustic or seismic signal. (Note: The Schwarzschild radius of a 10^{12} kg black hole is approximately 148 fm (1.48×10^{−13} m), which is much smaller than an atom but larger than an atomic nucleus.) On the moon, it may leave a distinct type of crater, still visible after billions of years.

== Human-made micro black holes ==
=== Feasibility of production ===
In familiar three-dimensional gravity, the minimum energy of a microscopic black hole is 10^{16} TeV (equivalent to 1.6 GJ or 444 kWh), which would have to be condensed into a region on the order of the Planck length. This is far beyond the limits of any current technology. It is estimated that to collide two particles to within a distance of a Planck length with currently achievable magnetic field strengths would require a ring accelerator about 1,000 light years in diameter to keep the particles on track.

However, in some scenarios involving extra dimensions of space, the Planck mass can be as low as the TeV range. The Large Hadron Collider (LHC) has a design energy of 14 TeV for proton–proton collisions and 1,150 TeV for Pb–Pb collisions. It was argued in 2001 that, in these circumstances, black hole production could be an important and observable effect at the LHC or future higher-energy colliders. Such quantum black holes should decay emitting sprays of particles that could be seen by detectors at these facilities. A paper by Choptuik and Pretorius, published in 2010 in Physical Review Letters, presented a computer-generated proof that micro black holes must form from two colliding particles with sufficient energy, which might be allowable at the energies of the LHC if additional dimensions are present other than the customary four (three spatial, one temporal).

=== Safety ===
Hawking's calculation and more general quantum mechanical arguments predict that micro black holes evaporate almost instantaneously. Additional safety arguments beyond those based on Hawking radiation were given in the paper, which showed that in hypothetical scenarios with stable micro black holes massive enough to destroy Earth, such black holes would have been produced by cosmic rays and would have likely already destroyed astronomical objects such as planets, stars, or stellar remnants such as neutron stars and white dwarfs.

== Black holes in quantum theories of gravity ==
It is possible, in some theories of quantum gravity, to calculate the quantum corrections to ordinary, classical black holes. Contrarily to conventional black holes, which are solutions of gravitational field equations of the general theory of relativity, quantum gravity black holes incorporate quantum gravity effects in the vicinity of the origin, where classically a curvature singularity occurs. According to the theory employed to model quantum gravity effects, there are different kinds of quantum gravity black holes, namely loop quantum black holes, non-commutative black holes, and asymptotically safe black holes. In these approaches, black holes are singularity-free.

Virtual micro black holes were proposed by Stephen Hawking in 1995 and by Fabio Scardigli in 1999 as part of a Grand Unified Theory as a quantum gravity candidate.

== See also ==
- Black hole electron
- Black hole starship
- Black holes in fiction
- ER=EPR
- Kugelblitz (astrophysics)
- Strangelet

== Bibliography ==
- Page, Don N. (January 15, 1976). "Particle emission rates from a black hole: Massless particles from an uncharged, nonrotating hole". Physical Review D. 13 (2): 198–206. Bibcode:1976PhRvD..13..198P. doi:10.1103/PhysRevD.13.198. ISSN 0556-2821. First detailed studies of the evaporation mechanism.
- Carr, B. J.; Hawking, S. W. (August 1, 1974). "Black Holes in the Early Universe". Monthly Notices of the Royal Astronomical Society. 168 (2): 399–415. arXiv:1209.2243. Bibcode:1974MNRAS.168..399C. doi:10.1093/mnras/168.2.399. ISSN 0035-8711. Links between primordial black holes and the early universe.
- Experimental searches for primordial black holes thanks to the emitted antimatter:
  - Barrau, A.; Boudoul, G.; Donato, F.; Maurin, D.; Salati, P.; Taillet, R. (June 2002). "Antiprotons from primordial black holes". Astronomy & Astrophysics. 388 (2): 676–687. arXiv:astro-ph/0112486. Bibcode:2002A&A...388..676B. doi:10.1051/0004-6361:20020313. ISSN 0004-6361.
  - Barrau, A.; Boudoul, G.; Donato, F.; Maurin, D.; Salati, P.; Stéfanon, I.; Taillet, R. (February 2003). "Antideuterons as a probe of primordial black holes". Astronomy & Astrophysics. 398 (2): 403–410. arXiv:astro-ph/0207395. Bibcode:2003A&A...398..403B. doi:10.1051/0004-6361:20021588. ISSN 0004-6361.
  - Barrau, A.; Feron, C.; Grain, J. (September 10, 2005). "Astrophysical Production of Microscopic Black Holes in a Low–Planck-Scale World". The Astrophysical Journal. 630 (2): 1015–1019. arXiv:astro-ph/0505436. Bibcode:2005ApJ...630.1015B. doi:10.1086/432033. ISSN 0004-637X.
- Boudoul, G.; Barrau, A. (2002). "Some aspects of primordial black hole physics". arXiv:astro-ph/0212225. Cosmology with primordial black holes
- Barrau, A.; Grain, J.; Alexeyev, S. (March 2004). "Gauss–Bonnet black holes at the LHC: beyond the dimensionality of space". Physics Letters B. 584 (1–2): 114–122. arXiv:hep-ph/0311238. Bibcode:2004PhLB..584..114B. doi:10.1016/j.physletb.2004.01.019. Searches for new physics (quantum gravity) with primordial black holes
- Kanti, Panagiota (November 20, 2004). "Black Holes in Theories with Large Extra Dimensions: a Review". International Journal of Modern Physics A. 19 (29): 4899–4951. arXiv:hep-ph/0402168. Bibcode:2004IJMPA..19.4899K. doi:10.1142/S0217751X04018324. ISSN 0217-751X. Evaporating black holes and extra dimensions
- Ida, Daisuke; Oda, Kin-ya; Park, Seong Chan (June 15, 2006). "Rotating black holes at future colliders. III. Determination of black hole evolution". Physical Review D. 73 (12) 124022. arXiv:hep-th/0602188. Bibcode:2006PhRvD..73l4022I. doi:10.1103/PhysRevD.73.124022. ISSN 1550-7998. Determination of black hole's life and extra dimensions
- Hossenfelder, Sabine (2004). "What Black Holes Can Teach Us". arXiv:hep-ph/0412265.
- Modesto, Leonardo (December 7, 2004). "Disappearance of Black Hole Singularity in Quantum Gravity". Physical Review D. 70 (12) 124009. arXiv:gr-qc/0407097. doi:10.1103/PhysRevD.70.124009. ISSN 1550-7998.
- Nicolini, Piero; Smailagic, Anais; Spallucci, Euro (January 2006). "Noncommutative geometry inspired Schwarzschild black hole". Physics Letters B. 632 (4): 547–551. arXiv:gr-qc/0510112. Bibcode:2006PhLB..632..547N. doi:10.1016/j.physletb.2005.11.004.
- Bonanno, A.; Reuter, M. (April 19, 2006). "Spacetime structure of an evaporating black hole in quantum gravity". Physical Review D. 73 (8) 083005. arXiv:hep-th/0602159. Bibcode:2006PhRvD..73h3005B. doi:10.1103/PhysRevD.73.083005. ISSN 1550-7998.
- Fujioka, Shinsuke; et al. (November 2009). "X-ray astronomy in the laboratory with a miniature compact object produced by laser-driven implosion". Nature Physics. 5 (11): 821–825. arXiv:0909.0315. Bibcode:2009NatPh...5..821F. doi:10.1038/nphys1402. ISSN 1745-2473. S2CID 56423571.
- Harrison, B. K.; Thorne, K. S.; Wakano, M.; Wheeler, J. A. (1965). Gravitation Theory and Gravitational Collapse. Chicago ; London: University of Chicago Press. pp. 80–81.
