= Entropic gravity =

Theory in modern physics that describes gravity as an entropic force

The theory of entropic gravity abides by Newton's law of universal gravitation on Earth and at interplanetary distances but diverges from this classic nature at interstellar distances.

Entropic gravity, also known as emergent gravity, is a theory in modern physics that describes gravity as an entropic force—a force with macro-scale homogeneity but which is subject to quantum-level disorder—and not a fundamental interaction. The theory, based on string theory, black hole physics, and quantum information theory, describes gravity as an emergent phenomenon that springs from the quantum entanglement of small bits of spacetime information. As such, entropic gravity is said to abide by the second law of thermodynamics under which the entropy of a physical system tends to increase over time.

The theory has been controversial within the physics community but has sparked research and experiments to test its validity.

== Significance ==
At its simplest, the theory holds that when gravity becomes vanishingly weak—levels seen only at interstellar distances—it diverges from its classically understood nature and its strength begins to decay linearly with distance from a mass.

Entropic gravity provides an underlying framework to explain modified Newtonian dynamics, or MOND, which holds that at a gravitational acceleration threshold of approximately 1.2×10^{−10} m/s^{2}, gravitational strength begins to vary inversely linearly with distance from a mass rather than the normal inverse-square law of the distance. This is an exceedingly low threshold, measuring only 12 trillionths gravity's strength at Earth's surface; an object dropped from a height of one meter would fall for 36 hours were Earth's gravity this weak. It is also 3,000 times less than the remnant of Earth's gravitational field that exists at the point where Voyager 1 crossed the solar system's heliopause and entered interstellar space.

The theory claims to be consistent with both the macro-level observations of Newtonian gravity as well as Einstein's theory of general relativity and its gravitational distortion of spacetime. Importantly, the theory also explains (without invoking the existence of dark matter and tweaking of its new free parameters) why galactic rotation curves differ from the profile expected with visible matter.

The theory of entropic gravity posits that what has been interpreted as unobserved dark matter is the product of quantum effects that can be regarded as a form of positive dark energy that lifts the vacuum energy of space from its ground state value. A central tenet of the theory is that the positive dark energy leads to a thermal-volume law contribution to entropy that overtakes the area law of anti-de Sitter space precisely at the cosmological horizon.

Thus this theory provides an alternative explanation for what mainstream physics currently attributes to dark matter. Since dark matter is believed to compose the vast majority of the universe's mass, a theory in which it is absent has huge implications for cosmology. In addition to continuing theoretical work in various directions, there are many experiments planned or in progress to actually detect or better determine the properties of dark matter (beyond its gravitational attraction), all of which would be undermined by an alternative explanation for the gravitational effects currently attributed to this elusive entity.

== Origin ==
The thermodynamic description of gravity has a history that goes back at least to research on black hole thermodynamics by Jacob Bekenstein and Stephen Hawking in the mid-1970s. These studies suggest a deep connection between gravity and thermodynamics, which describes the behavior of heat. In 1995, Theodore Jacobson demonstrated that the Einstein field equations describing relativistic gravitation can be derived by combining general thermodynamic considerations with the equivalence principle. Subsequently, other physicists, most notably Thanu Padmanabhan and Ginestra Bianconi, began to explore links between gravity and entropy.

== Erik Verlinde's theory ==
In 2009, Erik Verlinde proposed a conceptual model that describes gravity as an entropic force. He argues (similar to Jacobson's result) that gravity is a consequence of the "information associated with the positions of material bodies". This model combines the thermodynamic approach to gravity with Gerard 't Hooft's holographic principle. It implies that gravity is not a fundamental interaction, but an emergent phenomenon which arises from the statistical behavior of microscopic degrees of freedom encoded on a holographic screen. The paper drew a variety of responses from the scientific community. Andrew Strominger, a string theorist at Harvard said "Some people have said it can't be right, others that it's right and we already knew it – that it's right and profound, right and trivial."

In July 2011, Verlinde presented the further development of his ideas in a contribution to the Strings 2011 conference, including an explanation for the origin of dark matter.

Verlinde's article also attracted a large amount of media exposure, and led to immediate follow-up work in cosmology, the dark energy hypothesis, cosmological acceleration, cosmological inflation, and loop quantum gravity. Also, a specific microscopic model has been proposed that indeed leads to entropic gravity emerging at large scales. Entropic gravity can emerge from quantum entanglement of local Rindler horizons.

== Derivation of the law of gravitation ==
The law of gravitation is derived from classical statistical mechanics applied to the holographic principle, that states that the description of a volume of space can be thought of as $N$ bits of binary information, encoded on a boundary to that region, a closed surface of area $A$. The information is evenly distributed on the surface with each bit requiring an area equal to $\ell_\text{P}^2$, the so-called Planck area, from which $N$ can thus be computed:
$$N = \frac{A}{\ell_\text{P}^2}$$
where $\ell_\text{P}$ is the Planck length. The Planck length is defined as:
$$\ell_\text{P} = \sqrt\frac{\hbar G}{c^3}$$
where $G$ is the universal gravitational constant, $c$ is the speed of light, and $\hbar$ is the reduced Planck constant. When substituted in the equation for $N$ we find:
$$N = \frac{A c^3}{\hbar G}$$

The statistical equipartition theorem defines the temperature $T$ of a system with $N$ degrees of freedom in terms of its energy $E$ such that:
$$E = \frac{1}{2} N k_\text{B} T$$
where $k_\text{B}$ is the Boltzmann constant. [Note, though, that, according to the same equipartition theorem, this only applies to the quadratic degrees of freedom, that is, to those degrees of freedom $Q$ whose contribution to the total internal energy is of the form $Q^2$. This means that one is assuming a model of matter as formed by a collection of independent harmonic oscillators.] This is the equivalent energy for a mass $M$ according to:
$$E = Mc^2.$$

The effective temperature experienced due to a uniform acceleration in a vacuum field according to the Unruh effect is:
$$T = \frac{\hbar a}{2\pi c k_\text{B}},$$
where $a$ is that acceleration, which for a mass $m$ would be attributed to a force $F$ according to Newton's second law of motion:
$$F = ma.$$

Taking the holographic screen to be a sphere of radius $r$, the surface area would be given by:
$$A = 4\pi r^2.$$

From algebraic substitution of these into the above relations, one derives Newton's law of universal gravitation:
$$F = m \frac{2\pi c k_\text{B} T}{\hbar} = m \frac{4\pi c}{\hbar} \frac{E}{N} = m \frac{4\pi c^3}{\hbar} \frac{M}{N} = m 4\pi \frac{GM}{A} = G \frac{m M}{r^2}.$$

Note that this derivation assumes that the number of the binary bits of information is equal to the number of the degrees of freedom.
$$\frac{A}{\ell_\text{P}^2} = N = \frac{2 E}{k_\text{B} T}$$

== Criticism and experimental tests ==
Entropic gravity, as proposed by Verlinde in his original article, reproduces the Einstein field equations and, in a Newtonian approximation, a $\ \tfrac{\ 1\ }{ r }\$ potential for gravitational forces. Since its results do not differ from Newtonian gravity except in regions of extremely small gravitational fields, testing the theory with Earth-based laboratory experiments does not appear feasible. Spacecraft-based experiments performed at Lagrangian points within the Solar System would be expensive and challenging.

Even so, entropic gravity in its current form has been severely challenged on formal grounds. Matt Visser has shown that the attempt to model conservative forces in the general Newtonian case (i.e. for arbitrary potentials and an unlimited number of discrete masses) leads to unphysical requirements for the required entropy and involves an unnatural number of temperature baths of differing temperatures. Visser concludes:

There is no reasonable doubt concerning the physical reality of entropic forces, and no reasonable doubt that classical (and semi-classical) general relativity is closely related to thermodynamics [52–55]. Based on the work of Jacobson [1–6], Thanu Padmanabhan [7–12], and others, there are also good reasons to suspect a thermodynamic interpretation of the fully relativistic Einstein equations might be possible. Whether the specific proposals of Verlinde [26] are anywhere near as fundamental is yet to be seen – the rather baroque construction needed to accurately reproduce n-body Newtonian gravity in a Verlinde-like setting certainly gives one pause.

For the derivation of Einstein's equations from an entropic gravity perspective, Tower Wang shows that the inclusion of energy-momentum conservation and cosmological homogeneity and isotropy requirements severely restricts a wide class of potential modifications of entropic gravity, some of which have been used to generalize entropic gravity beyond the singular case of an entropic model of Einstein's equations. Wang asserts that:

As indicated by our results, the modified entropic gravity models of form (2), if not killed, should live in a very narrow room to assure the energy-momentum conservation and to accommodate a homogeneous isotropic universe.

Cosmological observations using available technology can be used to test the theory. On the basis of lensing by the galaxy cluster Abell 1689, Nieuwenhuizen concludes that EG is strongly ruled out unless additional (dark) matter-like eV neutrinos is added. A team from Leiden Observatory statistically observing the lensing effect of gravitational fields at large distances from the centers of more than 33,000 galaxies found that those gravitational fields were consistent with Verlinde's theory. Using conventional gravitational theory, the fields implied by these observations (as well as from measured galaxy rotation curves) could only be ascribed to a particular distribution of dark matter. In June 2017, a study by Princeton University researcher Kris Pardo asserted that Verlinde's theory is inconsistent with the observed rotation velocities of dwarf galaxies. (Note: "Emergent gravity successfully predicts the rotation velocities of the smallest galaxies in the sample. But it predicts velocities far too low for the more massive galaxies, especially the ones full of gas clouds. This discrepancy could pose a serious problem for emergent gravity, since the main success of the theory so far has been predicting the rotation curves of large galaxies.") Another theory of entropy based on geometric considerations (Quantitative Geometrical Thermodynamics, QGT) provides an entropic basis for the holographic principle and also offers another explanation for galaxy rotation curves as being due to the entropic influence of the central supermassive black hole found in the center of a spiral galaxy.

In 2018, Zhi-Wei Wang and Samuel L. Braunstein showed that, while spacetime surfaces near black holes (called stretched horizons) do obey an analog of the first law of thermodynamics, ordinary spacetime surfaces – including holographic screens – generally do not, thus undermining the key thermodynamic assumption of the emergent gravity program.

=== Entropic gravity and quantum coherence ===
Another criticism of entropic gravity is that entropic processes should, as critics argue, break quantum coherence. There is no theoretical framework quantitatively describing the strength of such decoherence effects, though. The temperature of the gravitational field in the earth's gravity well is very small (on the order of 10^{−19} K).

Experiments with ultra-cold neutrons in the gravitational field of Earth are claimed to show that neutrons lie on discrete levels exactly as predicted by the Schrödinger equation considering the gravitation to be a conservative potential field without any decoherent factors. Archil Kobakhidze argues that this result disproves entropic gravity, while Chaichian et al. suggest a potential loophole in the argument in weak gravitational fields such as those affecting Earth-bound experiments.

== See also ==
- Abraham–Lorentz force – Recoil force on accelerating charged particle
- Beyond black holes – Concept in general relativity and quantum field theory
- Black hole electron – Solution of Einstein field equations
- Entropic elasticity of an ideal chain – Molecular model for describing polymers
- Entropic force – Physical force that originates from thermodynamics instead of fundamental interactions
- Gravity – Attraction of masses and energy
- Hawking radiation – Hypothetical astrophysical effect
- Induced gravity – Idea in quantum gravity
- List of quantum gravity researchers
- Quantum relative entropy – Measure of distinguishability between two quantum states
