= Black hole starship =

Theoretical propulsion system capable of interstellar distances

In astronautics, a black hole starship is the suggestion that an artificial black hole could be used for spacecraft propulsion in a starship capable of interstellar travel. The concept was first discussed in science fiction, notably in the book Imperial Earth by Arthur C. Clarke, and in the work of Charles Sheffield, in which energy extracted from a Kerr–Newman black hole is described as powering the rocket engines in the story "Killing Vector" (1978).

A proposal to create an artificial black hole and using a parabolic reflector to reflect its Hawking radiation was discussed in 2009 by Louis Crane and Shawn Westmoreland. Their conclusion was that it was on the edge of possibility, but that quantum gravity effects that are presently unknown will either make it easier, or make it impossible. Investigation of the quantum gravity effects show it is not possible to create a black hole from light alone.

== Conceptual starship ==
One concept for a black hole starship creates a Kugelblitz, a small synthetic black hole from intense converging gamma rays, then intercepts the Hawking radiation from the black hole only in the direction of flight with a tungsten Dyson hemisphere. The spaceship pushes the black hole from behind, using particle beams.

=== Criteria ===
For a black hole to be used in space travel it must meet five criteria:

1. has a long enough lifespan to be useful,
2. is powerful enough to accelerate itself up to a reasonable fraction of the speed of light in a reasonable amount of time,
3. is small enough that we can access the energy to make it,
4. is large enough that we can focus the energy to make it,
5. has mass comparable to a starship.

These criteria imply a black hole weighing 606,000 metric tons (6.06 × 10^{8} kg) with a Schwarzschild radius of 0.9 attometers (0.9 × 10^{–18} m, or 9 × 10^{–19} m), a power output of 160 petawatts (160 × 10^{15} W, or 1.6 × 10^{17} W), and a 3.5-year lifespan. With such a power output, the black hole could accelerate to 10% the speed of light in 20 days, assuming 100% conversion of energy into kinetic energy. Assuming only 10% conversion into kinetic energy, it would take 10 times more.

Getting the black hole to act as a power source and engine also requires a way to convert the Hawking radiation into energy and thrust. One potential method involves placing the hole at the focal point of a parabolic reflector attached to the ship, creating forward thrust, if such a reflector can be built. A slightly easier, but less efficient method would involve simply absorbing all the gamma radiation heading towards the fore of the ship to push it onwards, and let the rest shoot out the back. This would, however, generate an enormous amount of heat as radiation is absorbed by the dish.

=== Advantages ===
Although beyond current technological capabilities, a black hole starship offers some advantages compared to other possible methods. For example, in nuclear fusion or fission, only a small proportion of the mass is converted into energy, so enormous quantities of fuel are needed. Another example, antimatter, is hugely energy-inefficient, and antimatter is difficult to contain. A black hole on the other hand is self-containing and very efficient in accepting mass which it radiates as energy.

=== Black holes from light ===
It has been shown that self-interaction effects of light lead to quantum dissipation effects, preventing the formation of a black hole from light alone. However these results have been challenged based on their assumption of adiabatic influx of radiation.

=== Engineering criticism ===
It is not clear that a starship powered by Hawking radiation can be made feasible within the laws of known physics. In the standard black hole thermodynamic model, the average energy of emitted quanta increases as size decreases, and extremely small black holes emit the majority of their energy in particles other than photons. In the Journal of the British Interplanetary Society, Jeffrey S. Lee of Icarus Interstellar states a typical quantum of radiation from a one-attometer black hole would be too energetic to be reflected. Lee further argues absorption (for example, by pair production from emitted gamma rays) may also be infeasible: A titanium "Dyson cap", optimized at 1 cm thickness and a radius around 33 km (to avoid melting), would absorb almost half the incident energy, but the maximum spaceship velocity over the black hole lifetime would be less than 0.0001c (about 30 km/s), according to Lee's calculations.

Govind Menon of Troy University suggests exploring the use of a rotating (Kerr–Newmann) black hole instead: "With non-rotating black holes, this is a very difficult thing...we typically look for energy almost exclusively from rotating black holes. Schwarzschild black holes do not radiate in an astrophysical, gamma ray burst point of view. It is not clear if Hawking radiation alone can power starships."

== In fiction ==
- Arthur C. Clarke, Imperial Earth (1976)
- Charles Sheffield, Killing Vector (1978)
- Peter Watts, The Freeze Frame Revolution (2016)
- In John Varley's 1977 novel The Ophiuchi Hotline, a black hole engine is used to move a moon of Jupiter to Alpha Centauri.
- In the 2014 Hannu Rajaniemi science fiction novel The Causal Angel, Jean le Flambeur's ship Leblanc has a black hole that emits Hawking radiation which is used for propulsion.
- In the Star Trek universe, the Romulan D'deridex-class warbird uses an artificial quantum singularity as a power source for its warp propulsion drive.
- In the 1997 Paul W. S. Anderson science fiction horror film Event Horizon, the eponymous starship uses an artificial black hole drive to achieve faster-than-light travel.
- In the MMO Eve Online, starships designed by the Triglavian faction utilize naked singularities contained on the external hull as their vessel's primary power source.
- In the Foundation TV series, jump ships appear to use black holes to power their jumpdrives, enabling faster-than-light (FTL) travel over interstellar distances. This differs from the book series on which the show is based, where FTL travel is facilitated through hyperspace travel.
- In the universe of Doctor Who, the TARDIS is powered by a black hole which enables it to travel through time and space.
- In Sequoia Nagamatsu's novel How High We Go in the Dark, an interstellar starship is used to take passengers in cryo-sleep 582 light years from Earth at 10% the speed of light. The starship uses an engine powered by Hawking radiation.

== See also ==
- Abraham–Lorentz force
- Black hole thermodynamics
- Hawking radiation
- Kugelblitz (astrophysics)
- List of quantum gravity researchers
- Micro black hole
