= Trans-Planckian problem =

Problematic appearance of quantities beyond the Planck scale

In black hole physics and inflationary cosmology, the trans-Planckian problem is the problem of the appearance of quantities beyond the Planck scale, which raise doubts on the physical validity of some results in these two areas, since one expects the physical laws to suffer radical modifications beyond the Planck scale.

In black hole physics, the original derivation of Hawking radiation involved field modes that, near the black hole horizon, have arbitrarily high frequencies—in particular, higher than the inverse Planck time, although these do not appear in the final results. A number of different alternative derivations have been proposed in order to overcome this problem.

The trans-Planckian problem can be conveniently considered in the framework of sonic black holes, condensed matter systems which can be described in a similar way as real black holes. In these systems, the analogue of the Planck scale is the interatomic scale, where the continuum description loses its validity. One can study whether in these systems the analogous process to Hawking radiation still occurs despite the short-scale cutoff represented by the interatomic distance.

The trans-Planckian problem also appears in inflationary cosmology. The cosmological scales that we nowadays observe correspond to length scales smaller than the Planck length at the onset of inflation.

== Trans-Planckian problem in Hawking radiation ==
The trans-Planckian problem is the issue that Hawking's original calculation includes quantum particles where the wavelength becomes shorter than the Planck length near the black hole's horizon. This is due to the peculiar behavior there, where time stops as measured from far away. A particle emitted from a black hole with a finite frequency, if traced back to the horizon, must have had an infinite frequency, and therefore a trans-Planckian wavelength.

The Unruh effect and the Hawking effect both talk about field modes in the superficially stationary spacetime that change frequency relative to other coordinates which are regular across the horizon. This is necessarily so, since to stay outside a horizon requires acceleration which constantly Doppler shifts the modes.

An outgoing Hawking radiated photon, if the mode is traced back in time, has a frequency which diverges from that which it has at great distance, as it gets closer to the horizon, which requires the wavelength of the photon to "scrunch up" infinitely at the horizon of the black hole. In a maximally extended external Schwarzschild solution, that photon's frequency stays regular only if the mode is extended back into the past region where no observer can go. That region seems to be unobservable and is physically suspect, so Hawking used a black hole solution without a past region which forms at a finite time in the past. In that case, the source of all the outgoing photons can be identified: a microscopic point right at the moment that the black hole first formed.

The quantum fluctuations at that tiny point, in Hawking's original calculation, contain all the outgoing radiation. The modes that eventually contain the outgoing radiation at long times are redshifted by such a huge amount by their long sojourn next to the event horizon, that they start off as modes with a wavelength much shorter than the Planck length. Since the laws of physics at such short distances are unknown, some find Hawking's original calculation unconvincing.

The trans-Planckian problem is nowadays mostly considered a mathematical artifact of horizon calculations. The same effect occurs for regular matter falling onto a white hole solution. Matter which falls on the white hole accumulates on it, but has no future region into which it can go. Tracing the future of this matter, it is compressed onto the final singular endpoint of the white hole evolution, into a trans-Planckian region. The reason for these types of divergences is that modes which end at the horizon from the point of view of outside coordinates are singular in frequency there. The only way to determine what happens classically is to extend in some other coordinates that cross the horizon.

There exist alternative physical pictures which give the Hawking radiation in which the trans-Planckian problem is addressed. The key point is that similar trans-Planckian problems occur when the modes occupied with Unruh radiation are traced back in time. In the Unruh effect, the magnitude of the temperature can be calculated from ordinary Minkowski field theory, and is not controversial.
