= World crystal =

Theoretical model of gravity

In physics, world crystal is a theoretical model of spacetime consistent with general relativity but based on a lattice with the dimensions of the Planck length. Defects in the crystal cause the curvature effects of mass-energy on spacetime. Proposed by Hagen Kleinert, it provides an alternative understanding of gravity and an alternative to the extra-dimensional concepts of string theory.

== Overview ==
The world crystal model is an alternative which exploits the fact that crystals with defects have the same non-Euclidean geometry as spaces with curvature and torsion. Thus the world crystal represents a model for emergent or induced gravity in an Einstein–Cartan theory of gravitation (which embraces Einstein's theory of General Relativity). The model illustrates that the world may have, at Planck distances, quite different properties from those predicted by string theorists. In this model, matter creates defects in spacetime which generate curvature and all the effects of general relativity.

The existence of a shortest length at the Planck level has interesting consequences for quantum physics at ultrahigh energies. For example, the uncertainty relation will be modified. The world crystal implies specific modifications.

== See also ==
- Quantum cosmology
- Non-standard cosmology

== Literature ==
- Kleinert, H. (2008). Multivalued Fields in Condensed Matter, Electrodynamics, and Gravitation (PDF). World Scientific. pp. 338ff. ISBN 978-981-279-170-2. Archived from the original (PDF) on 2012-07-16.
- Danielewski, M. (2005). "Defects and Diffusion in the Planck-Kleinert Crystal: The Matter, Gravity, and Electromagnetism" (PDF). Proceedings of the 1st International Conference on Diffusion in Solids and Liquids.
- Kleinert, H.; Zaanen, J. (2004). "World Nematic Crystal Model of Gravity Explaining the Absence of Torsion". Physics Letters A. 324 (5–6): 361–365. arXiv:gr-qc/0307033. Bibcode:2004PhLA..324..361K. doi:10.1016/j.physleta.2004.03.048.
- t' Hooft, G. (2008). "Crystalline Gravity" (PDF). Erice Lectures 2008.
