= Kugelblitz (astrophysics) =

Black hole created from highly concentrated energy

A kugelblitz (German: [ˈkuːɡl̩ˌblɪt͡s]) (English: ball lightning) is a theoretical astrophysical object predicted by general relativity. It is a concentration of heat, light, or radiation so intense that its energy forms an event horizon and becomes self-trapped. In other words, if enough radiation is aimed into a region of space, the concentration of energy can warp spacetime so much that it creates a black hole. This would be a black hole the original mass–energy of which was in the form of radiant energy rather than matter; however, there is currently no uniformly accepted method of distinguishing black holes by origin. (See the no-hair theorem.)

John Archibald Wheeler's 1955 Physical Review paper entitled "Geons" refers to the kugelblitz phenomenon and explores the idea of creating such particles (or toy models of particles) from spacetime curvature. This paper coined the term kugelblitz.

The formation of a kugelblitz may be impossible due to dissipative quantum effects like vacuum polarization, which prevent sufficient energy buildup to create an event horizon. The intensity needed to directly verify this calculation is 50 orders of magnitude than attainable currently and the spontaneous disintegration of a high-energy photon into an electron–positron pair (the Schwinger effect) requires 1000 times more energy than the most advanced lasers can produce. These conclusions rest on the assumption that radiation enters the black hole region adiabatically. A rapidly changing influx may allow black holes to form solely from photons.

It has been speculated that the kugelblitz could be the basis for interstellar engines (drives) of future black hole starships.

== In fiction ==
- A kugelblitz is a major plot point in the third season of the American superhero television series The Umbrella Academy (2019–2024).
- A kugelblitz is the home of a major faction in the Heechee Saga (1972–2004) by Frederik Pohl.
- A universe-destroying kugelblitz is part of the plot in The World We Make (2022) by N. K. Jemisin.

== See also ==
- Bekenstein bound
- Micro black hole
