= Optical black hole =

Optical phenomenon

An optical black hole is a phenomenon in which slow light is passed through a Bose–Einstein condensate that is itself spinning faster than the local speed of light within to create a vortex capable of trapping the light behind an event horizon just as a gravitational black hole would.

Unlike other black hole analogs such as a sonic black hole in a Bose–Einstein condensate, a slow light black hole analog is not expected to mimic the quantum effects of a black hole, and thus not emit Hawking radiation. It does, however, mimic the classical properties of a gravitational black hole, making it potentially useful in studying other properties of black holes. More recently, some physicists have developed a fiber optic based system which they believe will emit Hawking radiation.

== See also ==
- Sonic black hole
- Analog models of gravity
