= Acoustic metric =

Tensor characterizing signal-carrying properties in a medium

In acoustics and fluid dynamics, an acoustic metric (also known as a sonic metric) is a metric that describes the signal-carrying properties of a given particulate medium.

(Generally, in mathematical physics, a metric describes the arrangement of relative distances within a surface or volume, usually measured by signals passing through the region – essentially describing the intrinsic geometry of the region.)

== A simple fluid example ==
For simplicity, we will assume that the underlying background geometry is Euclidean, and that this space is filled with an isotropic inviscid fluid at zero temperature (e.g., a superfluid). This fluid is described by a density field ρ and a velocity field $\vec{v}$. The speed of sound at any given point depends upon the compressibility, which in turn depends upon the density at that point. It requires much work to compress anything more into an already compacted space. This can be specified by the "speed of sound field" c. Now, the combination of both isotropy and Galilean covariance tells us that the permissible velocities of the sound waves at a given point x, $\vec{u}$ has to satisfy
$$(\vec{u}-\vec{v}(x))^2=c(x)^2$$

This restriction can also arise if we imagine that sound is like "light" moving through a spacetime described by an effective metric tensor called the acoustic metric.

The acoustic metric is
$$\mathbf{g}=g_{00}dt \otimes dt+2g_{0i}dx^i \otimes dt+g_{ij} dx^i \otimes dx^j$$

"Light" moving with a velocity of $\vec{u}$ (not the 4-velocity) has to satisfy
$$g_{00}+2g_{0i}u^i+g_{ij}u^i u^j=0$$

If
$$g=\alpha^2\begin{pmatrix}-(c^2-v^2)&-\vec{v}\\-\vec{v}&\mathbf{1}\end{pmatrix} ,$$
where α is some conformal factor which is yet to be determined (see Weyl rescaling), we get the desired velocity restriction. α may be some function of the density, for example.

== Acoustic horizons ==
An acoustic metric can give rise to "acoustic horizons" (also known as "sonic horizons"), analogous to the event horizons in the spacetime metric of general relativity. However, unlike the spacetime metric, in which the invariant speed is the absolute upper limit on the propagation of all causal effects, the invariant speed in an acoustic metric is not the upper limit on propagation speeds. For example, the speed of sound is less than the speed of light. As a result, the horizons in acoustic metrics are not perfectly analogous to those associated with the spacetime metric. It is possible for certain physical effects to propagate back across an acoustic horizon. Such propagation is sometimes considered to be analogous to Hawking radiation, although the latter arises from quantum field effects in curved spacetime.

== See also ==
- Acoustics
- Analog models of gravity
- Gravastar
- Hawking radiation
- Quantum gravity
- Superfluid vacuum theory
