= Sonic black hole =

Acoustic analogue of a black hole in which sound plays the role of light

A sonic black hole, sometimes called a dumb hole or acoustic black hole, is a phenomenon in which phonons (sound perturbations) are unable to escape from a region of a fluid that is flowing more quickly than the local speed of sound. They are called sonic, or acoustic, black holes because these trapped phonons are analogous to light in astrophysical (gravitational) black holes. Physicists are interested in them because they have many properties similar to astrophysical black holes and, in particular, emit a phononic version of Hawking radiation. This Hawking radiation can be spontaneously created by quantum vacuum fluctuations, in close analogy with Hawking radiation from a real black hole. On the other hand, the Hawking radiation can be stimulated in a classical process. The boundary of a sonic black hole, at which the flow speed changes from being greater than the speed of sound to less than the speed of sound, is called the event horizon.

== History of the concept ==
Acoustic black holes were first theorized to be useful by W. G. Unruh in 1981. However, the first black hole analogue was not created in a laboratory until 2009. It was created in a rubidium Bose–Einstein condensate using a technique called density inversion. This technique creates a flow by repelling the condensate with a potential minimum. The surface gravity and temperature of the sonic black hole were measured, but no attempt was made to detect Hawking radiation. However, the scientists who created it predicted that the experiment was suitable for detection and suggested a method by which it might be done by lasing the phonons. In 2014, stimulated Hawking radiation was reported in an analogue black-hole laser by the same researchers. Quantum, spontaneous Hawking radiation was observed later.

A rotating sonic black hole was used in 2010 to give the first laboratory testing of superradiance, a process whereby energy is extracted from a black hole.

== Overview ==
=== Perfect fluids ===
Sonic black holes are possible because phonons in perfect fluids exhibit the same properties of motion as fields, such as gravity, in space and time. For this reason, a system in which a sonic black hole can be created is called a gravity analogue. Nearly any fluid can be used to create an acoustic event horizon, but the viscosity of most fluids creates random motion that makes features like Hawking radiation nearly impossible to detect. The complexity of such a system would make it very difficult to gain any knowledge about such features even if they could be detected. Many nearly perfect fluids have been suggested for use in creating sonic black holes, such as superfluid helium, one–dimensional degenerate Fermi gases, and Bose–Einstein condensate. Gravity analogues other than phonons in a fluid, such as slow light and a system of ions, have also been proposed for studying black hole analogues. The fact that so many systems mimic gravity is sometimes used as evidence for the theory of emergent gravity, which could help reconcile relativity with quantum mechanics.

=== Acoustic engineering ===
In addition to the above-mentioned sonic or acoustic black holes that can be viewed as analogues of astrophysical black holes, physical objects bearing the same names also exist in Acoustic and Vibration Engineering, where they are used for sound absorption and for damping structural vibrations. The Acoustic Black Hole effect in such objects can be achieved by creating a gradual reduction of sound velocity in a waveguide or elastic wave velocity in a solid structure (e.g. flexural wave velocity in thin plates) with propagation distance. The required velocity reduction should follow a power-law function of the propagation distance, and the velocity at the end of the wave propagation path should be reduced to almost zero. Also, measures should be taken to insert a small amount of traditional sound or vibration absorbing materials in the area of very low propagation velocity. Under these conditions, the described sonic or acoustic black holes provide almost 100% absorption of the incident air-borne or structure-borne acoustic waves.

== See also ==
- Acoustic metric
- Analog models of gravity
- Black hole
- Optical black hole
- Quantum gravity
