= Optical metric =

Metric in general relativity

The optical metric was defined by German theoretical physicist Walter Gordon in 1923 to study the geometrical optics in curved space-time filled with moving dielectric materials.

Let u_{a} be the normalized (covariant) 4-velocity of the arbitrarily-moving dielectric medium filling the space-time, and assume that the fluid's electromagnetic properties are linear, isotropic, transparent, nondispersive, and can be summarized by two scalar functions: a dielectric permittivity ε and a magnetic permeability μ.

Then the optical metric tensor is defined as

$$\hat{g}_{ab} = g_{ab} \pm \left(1 - \frac{1}{\epsilon\mu} \right) u_a u_b,$$

where $g_{ab}$ is the physical metric tensor. The sign of $\pm$ is determined by the metric signature convention used: $\pm$ is replaced with a plus sign (+) for a metric signature (-,+,+,+), while a minus sign (-) is chosen for (+,-,-,-).

The inverse (contravariant) optical metric tensor is

$$\hat{g}^{ab} = g^{ab} \pm (1 - \epsilon\mu) u^a u^b,$$

where u^{a} is the contravariant 4-velocity of the moving fluid. Note that the traditional refractive index is defined as n(x) ≡ √εμ .

== Properties ==
An important fact about Gordon's optical metric is that in curved space-time filled with dielectric material, electromagnetic waves (under geometrical optics approximation) follows geodesics of the optical metric instead of the physical metric. Consequently, the study of geometric optics in curved space-time with dielectric material can sometimes be simplified by using optical metric (note that the dynamics of the physical system is still described by the physical metric). For example, optical metric can be used to study the radiative transfer in stellar atmospheres around compact astrophysical objects such as neutron stars and white dwarfs, and in accretion disks around black holes. In cosmology, optical metric can be used to study the distance-redshift relation in cosmological models in which the intergalactic or interstellar medium have a non-vanishing refraction index.

== History ==
After the original introduction of the concept of optical metric by Gordon in 1923, the mathematical formalism of optical metric was further investigated by Jürgen Ehlers in 1967 including a detailed discussion of the geometrical optical approximation in curved space-time and the optical scalars transport equation. Gordon's optical metric was extended by Bin Chen and Ronald Kantowski to include light absorption. The original real optical metric was consequently extended into a complex one. The optical metric was further generalized by Robert Thompson from simple isotropic media described only by scalar-valued ε and μ to bianisotropic, magnetoelectrically coupled media residing in curved background space-times.

== Applications ==
The first application of Gordon's optical metric theory to cosmology was also made by Bin Chen and Ronald Kantowski.

The absorption corrected distance-redshift relation in the homogeneous and isotropic Friedman-Lemaitre-Robertson-Walker (FLRW) universe is called Gordon-Chen-Kantowski formalism and can be used to study the absorption of intergalactic medium (or cosmic opacity) in the Universe.

For example, the physical metric for a Robertson-Walker spacetime can be written (using the metric signature (-,+,+,+))

$$g = -c^2dt^2 + R^2(t)\left[\frac{dr^2}{1-kr^2} + r^2(d\theta^2 + \sin^2\theta \, d\phi^2) \right],$$

where $k = 1, 0, -1$ for a closed, flat, or open universe, and $R(t)$ is the scale factor. On the other hand, the optical metric for Robertson-Walker Universe filled with rest homogeneous refraction material is

$$\hat g = -\frac{c^2}{n^2(t)}dt^2 + R^2(t)\left[\frac{dr^2}{1-kr^2} + r^2(d\theta^2 + \sin^2\theta \, d\phi^2) \right],$$

where $n(t)$ the cosmic-time dependent refraction index.

The luminosity distance-redshift relation in a Flat FLRW universe with dark absorption can be written

$$d_L(z) = (1+z)\frac{c}{H_0}e^{-\tau/2}\int_0^z \frac{dz'}{h(z')}$$

where z is the cosmological redshift, c is the light speed, H_{0} the Hubble Constant, τ is the optical depth caused by absorption (or the so-called cosmic opacity), and h(z) is the dimensionless Hubble curve.

A non-zero cosmic opacity will render the standard candles such as Type Ia supernovae appear dimmer than expected from a transparent Universe. This can be used as an alternative explanation of the observed apparent acceleration of the cosmic expansion.

=== Analogue gravity ===
In analog models of gravity, the "Gordon form" expresses the metric for a curved spacetime as the sum of a flat (Minkowski) metric and a 4-velocity field u:

$$g_{\mu\nu} = \eta_{\mu\nu} + \big(1-n^{-2}\big)u_\mu u_\nu,$$

where n is the refractive index. This is analogous to Kerr-Schild form, which uses a null vector field in place of timelike. An open question is which spacetimes can be expressed in this way. The challenge is to pick coordinate systems for which the above relationship holds. Schwarzschild spacetime, which describes a non-rotating black hole, can be expressed this way. There has been progress for Kerr spacetime which describes a rotating black hole, but this case remains elusive.

== Electrodynamics in media residing in curved space-times ==
The dielectric permittivity ε and magnetic permeability μ are usually understood within the 3-vector representation of electrodynamics via the relations $\vec{D} = \varepsilon \vec{E}$ and $\vec{B} = \mu \vec{H},$ where $\vec{E},\vec{B},\vec{D},$ and $\vec{H}$ are, respectively, the electric field, magnetic flux density, electric displacement, and magnetic field intensity, and where ε and μ could be matrices. On the other hand, general relativity is formulated in the language of 4-dimensional tensors. To obtain the tensorial optical metric, medium properties such as permittivity, permeability, and magnetoelectric couplings must first be promoted to 4-dimensional covariant tensors, and the electrodynamics of light propagation through such media residing within a background space-time must also be expressed in a compatible 4-dimensional way. Here, electrodynamic fields will be described in terms of differential forms, exterior algebra, and the exterior derivative. Similar to the way that 3-vectors are denoted with an arrow, as in $\vec{E},$ 4-dimensional tensors will be denoted by bold symbols, for example $\boldsymbol{E}.$ The musical isomorphisms will be used to indicate raising and lowering of indices with the metric, and a dot notation is used to denote contraction on adjacent indices, e.g. $\boldsymbol{u}\cdot\boldsymbol{F} = u^{\alpha}F_{\alpha\beta}.$ The speed of light is set to $c =1,$ and the vacuum permeability and permittivity are likewise set to 1.

The fundamental quantity of electrodynamics is the potential 1-form $\boldsymbol{A},$ from which the field strength tensor is the 2-form $\boldsymbol{F} = d \boldsymbol{A}.$ From the nilpotency of the exterior derivative one immediately has the homogeneous Maxwell equations

$d \boldsymbol{F} = 0,$

while a variation of the Yang-Mills action

$S = \int \frac12{\boldsymbol F}\wedge\star {\boldsymbol F} - {\boldsymbol A} \wedge {\boldsymbol J}$

with respect to ${\boldsymbol A}$ provides the inhomogeneous Maxwell equations

$d\star{\mathbf F} = {\mathbf J}$

where ${\boldsymbol J}$ is the charge-current 3-form. Within dielectric media there exist charges bound up in otherwise neutral atoms. These charges are not free to move around very much, but distortions to the distribution of charge within the atom can allow dipole (or more generally multipole) moments to form, with which is associated a dipole field. Separating bound and free charges in the charge-current three form ${\boldsymbol J} = {\boldsymbol J}_{bound} + {\boldsymbol J}_{free},$ the bound source is associated with a particular solution called the polarization field $\boldsymbol{P}$ satisfying

$d\star{\boldsymbol P} = {\boldsymbol J}_{bound}.$

One may then write

$d{\boldsymbol G} = d\star({\boldsymbol F} + {\boldsymbol P}) = {\boldsymbol J}_{free}$

with the constitutive equation

${\boldsymbol G} = \star({\boldsymbol F} + {\boldsymbol P}).$

In linear media, the dipole moment is induced by the incident free field in such a way that the polarization field is linearly proportional to the free field, $\boldsymbol{P} = \boldsymbol{\zeta}(\boldsymbol{F})$ (in indices this is $P_{\alpha \beta} = \zeta_{\alpha\beta}{}^{\mu\nu}F_{\mu\nu}$). Then the constitutive equation can be written

$\boldsymbol{G} = \star\boldsymbol{\chi}\boldsymbol{F}.$

The $\binom{2}{2}$ tensor $\boldsymbol{\chi}=\chi_{\alpha\beta}{}^{\mu\nu}$ is antisymmetric in each pair of indices, and the vacuum is seen to be a trivial dielectric such that $\boldsymbol{\chi}_{vac}\boldsymbol{F}=\boldsymbol{F}.$ This means that the distribution of dielectric material within the curved background space-time can be completely described functionally by giving $\chi$ and smooth transitions from vacuum into media can be described. The electric and magnetic fields $\vec{E},\vec{B},\vec{D},$ and $\vec{H},$ as they are commonly understood in the 3-vector representation, have no independent existence. They are merely different parts of the 2-forms $\boldsymbol{F}$ and $\boldsymbol{G},$ as measured relative to a chosen observer. Let $\boldsymbol{u}$ be the contravariant velocity 4-vector of the observer. Then one may define the covariant 1-forms

$\boldsymbol{E}=\boldsymbol{u}\cdot\boldsymbol{F}, \quad \boldsymbol{B} = -\boldsymbol{u}\cdot\star\boldsymbol{F},$

$\mathbf{D} = -\mathbf{u}\cdot\star\mathbf{G}, \quad \mathbf{H} = -\mathbf{u}\cdot\mathbf{G}.$

The corresponding 3-vectors are obtained in Minkowski space-time by taking the purely spatial (relative to the observer) parts of the contravariant versions of these 1-forms. These 1-form field definitions can be used to re-express the 2-form constitutive equation to a set of two 1-form equations

$\boldsymbol{D} = \boldsymbol{\varepsilon}^c\cdot\boldsymbol{E} + \boldsymbol{\gamma}_b^c \cdot \boldsymbol{B},$

$\boldsymbol{H} = \boldsymbol{\xi}\cdot \boldsymbol{B} + \boldsymbol{\gamma}_e^c\cdot \mathbf{E}.$

where the $\binom{1}{1}$ tensors $\boldsymbol{\varepsilon}^c,\boldsymbol{\xi},\boldsymbol{\gamma}_b^c,$ and $\boldsymbol{\gamma}_e^c$ are

$\boldsymbol{\varepsilon}^c = -2(\boldsymbol{u}\cdot\boldsymbol{\chi}\cdot \boldsymbol{u}^{\flat}),$

$\boldsymbol{\xi} = 2(\boldsymbol{u}\cdot\star\boldsymbol{\chi}\star\cdot\boldsymbol{u}^{\flat}),$

$\boldsymbol{\gamma}_b^c = -2(\boldsymbol{u}\cdot\boldsymbol{\chi}\star\cdot\boldsymbol{u}^{\flat}),$

$\boldsymbol{\gamma}_e^c = 2(\boldsymbol{u}\cdot\star\boldsymbol{\chi}\cdot\boldsymbol{u}^{\flat}).$

Note that each of these tensors is orthogonal, or transverse, to $\boldsymbol{u},$ meaning that $\boldsymbol{u}\cdot\boldsymbol{\alpha} = \boldsymbol{\alpha}\cdot\boldsymbol{u}^{\flat} = 0$ for each $\boldsymbol{\alpha} \in \{\boldsymbol{\varepsilon}^c,\boldsymbol{\xi},\boldsymbol{\gamma}_b^c,\boldsymbol{\gamma}_e^c\}$, which can be seen from the antisymmetry of $\boldsymbol{\chi}$ on each pair of indices. Since each of the 1-form fields defined above is also transverse to $\boldsymbol{u},$ we may conclude that each $\boldsymbol{\alpha}$ is an automorphism of a subspace of the cotangent space defined by orthogonality with respect to the observer. In other words, everything operates in the observer's purely spatial 3-dimensional space. In terms of these parameters, $\boldsymbol{\chi}$ is found to be

$\boldsymbol{\chi} = \frac12 \left[ -(\boldsymbol{u}^{\flat}\wedge\boldsymbol{\varepsilon}^c\wedge\boldsymbol{u}) + \star(\boldsymbol{u}^{\flat}\wedge\boldsymbol{\xi}\wedge\boldsymbol{u}) -\star(\boldsymbol{u}^{\flat}\wedge\boldsymbol{\gamma}_e^c\wedge\boldsymbol{u}) +(\boldsymbol{u}^{\flat}\wedge\boldsymbol{\gamma}_b^c\wedge\boldsymbol{u})\star) \right].$

Although the set of 1-form constitutive equations shown above are the ones that follow most naturally from the covariant 2-form constitutive equation $\boldsymbol{G} = \star\boldsymbol{\chi}\boldsymbol{F}$, they are not the only possibility. Indeed, the traditional 3-vector formulation of the constitutive equations usually relates $\vec{B}$ and $\vec{H}$ by $\vec{B} = \mu\vec{H}$. Therefore, it could be desirable to rearrange the preceding set of relations into

$\boldsymbol{D} = \boldsymbol{\varepsilon}\cdot\boldsymbol{E} + \boldsymbol{\gamma}_h\cdot\boldsymbol{H},$

$\boldsymbol{B} = \boldsymbol{\mu}\cdot\boldsymbol{H} + \boldsymbol{\gamma}_e\cdot \boldsymbol{E},$

where $\boldsymbol{\varepsilon}, \boldsymbol{\mu}, \boldsymbol{\gamma}_h,\boldsymbol{\gamma}_e$ are related to $\boldsymbol{\varepsilon}^c,\boldsymbol{\xi},\boldsymbol{\gamma}_b^c,\boldsymbol{\gamma}_e^c$ by

$\boldsymbol{\mu} = \bar{\boldsymbol{\xi}},$

$\boldsymbol{\varepsilon} = \boldsymbol{\varepsilon}^c-\boldsymbol{\gamma}_b^c\cdot\boldsymbol{\mu}\cdot\boldsymbol{\gamma}_e^c,$

$\boldsymbol{\gamma}_e = -\boldsymbol{\mu}\cdot\boldsymbol{\gamma}_e^c,$

$\boldsymbol{\gamma}_h = \boldsymbol{\gamma}_b^c\cdot\boldsymbol{\mu}.$

The 4-dimensional inverse of these tensors does not exist, but the bar notation $\bar{\boldsymbol{\xi}}$ denotes an inverse defined with respect to the subspace orthogonal to $\boldsymbol{u},$ which exists and is a valid operation since it was noted above that $\boldsymbol\xi$ is an automorphism of this subspace. In Minkowski space-time, the space-space part (relative to observer $\boldsymbol{u}$) of each of these tensors is equivalent to the traditional $3\times 3$ constitutive matrices of 3-vector electrodynamics. In terms of this alternative set of constitutive tensors, $\boldsymbol{\chi}$ is found to be

$\boldsymbol{\chi} = \frac12 \left[ -(\boldsymbol{u}^{\flat}\wedge\boldsymbol{\varepsilon}\wedge\boldsymbol{u}) +[\star(\boldsymbol{u}^{\flat}\wedge \boldsymbol{h})+\boldsymbol{u}^{\flat}\wedge\boldsymbol{\gamma}_h] \cdot\bar{\boldsymbol{\mu}}\cdot[(\boldsymbol{h}\wedge\boldsymbol{u}\star+\boldsymbol{\gamma}_e\wedge\boldsymbol{u}] \right].$

Here,

$\boldsymbol{h} = \boldsymbol{\delta} - \boldsymbol{u}^{\flat}\otimes\boldsymbol{u}$

is a projection operator that annihilates any tensor components parallel to $\boldsymbol{u}.$ Since $\boldsymbol{h}\cdot\boldsymbol{\delta} = \boldsymbol{h},$ then $\boldsymbol{h}$ also serves as the Kronecker delta on the subspace orthogonal to $\boldsymbol{u}.$ In the vacuum, $\boldsymbol{\varepsilon} = \boldsymbol{\mu} = \boldsymbol{h}, \boldsymbol{\gamma}_e = \boldsymbol{\gamma}_h = 0.$

== Geometric optics and the optical metric ==
For light propagating through linear dielectric media, Maxewell's inhomogeneous equation in the absence of free sources represents a wave equation for $\boldsymbol{A}$ in the Lorenz gauge, $\delta\boldsymbol{A}=0$ (here $\delta$ is the codifferential), given by

$\star d\star \boldsymbol{\chi} d \mathbf{A}=\delta\boldsymbol{\chi} d\mathbf{A} = 0.$

A JWKB type approximation of plane wave solutions is assumed such that

$\boldsymbol{A} = \hat{\boldsymbol{A}} e^{-(i\lambda)^{-1}S}$

where the amplitude $\hat{\boldsymbol{A}}$ is assumed to be slowly varying compared to the phase function $S.$ Plugging this approximate solution into the wave equation, and retaining only the leading order terms in the limit $\lambda\to 0$ leads to

$-(\boldsymbol{k}^{\sharp}\cdot\boldsymbol{\chi}\cdot\boldsymbol{k})\cdot\hat{\boldsymbol{A}} = 0$

where $\boldsymbol{k}=dS.$ The existence of a solution to this equation requires

$\det\left( \boldsymbol{k}^{\sharp}\cdot\boldsymbol{\chi}\cdot\boldsymbol{k} \right)=0.$

In fact, this determinant condition is satisfied identically because the antisymmetry in the second pair of indices on $\boldsymbol{\chi}$ shows that $\hat{\boldsymbol{A}}\propto\boldsymbol{k}$ is already a trivial solution. Therefore, any non-trivial solutions must reside in the 3-dimensional subspace orthogonal to $\boldsymbol{k},$ so the tensor $\boldsymbol{k}^{\sharp}\cdot\boldsymbol{\chi}\cdot\boldsymbol{k}$ is effectively only 3-dimensional. Thus, the determinant condition is insufficient to provide any information. However, the classical adjugate of a matrix $M$ is related to its determinant by $M.\mathrm{adj}(M) = \det(M)I$. Since in this case $\det(M)=0$ but $M$ is arbitrary, one obtains the secondary condition

$\mathrm{adj}\left(\boldsymbol{k}^{\sharp}\cdot\boldsymbol{\chi}\cdot\boldsymbol{k}\right) = 0.$

Notice that the adjugate of a matrix is still a matrix, so the scalar determinant condition has now been replaced by a matrix condition. This would appear to add a great deal of complexity to the problem, but it has been shown that this adjugate has the form

$\mathrm{adj}\left(\boldsymbol{k}^{\sharp}\cdot\boldsymbol{\chi}\cdot\boldsymbol{k} \right) = P(\boldsymbol{k}\otimes\boldsymbol{k}^{\sharp}),$

where $P$ is a fourth order polynomial in $\boldsymbol{k}.$ The vanishing condition on the adjugate matrix is therefore equivalent to the scalar condition

$P=0.$

The goal now is to demonstrate that the polynomial $P$ takes the form

$P\propto \left[\frac12 \boldsymbol{\mathfrak{g}}_+^{-1}(\boldsymbol{k}\otimes\boldsymbol{k}) \right]\left[\frac12 \boldsymbol{\mathfrak{g}}_-^{-1}(\boldsymbol{k}\otimes\boldsymbol{k}) \right].$

Then the condition $P=0$ is satisfied by either of $\tfrac12 \boldsymbol{\mathfrak{g}}_{\pm}^{-1}(\boldsymbol{k}\otimes\boldsymbol{k})=0$ (written with indices, $\tfrac12 \mathfrak{g}_{\pm}^{\mu\nu}k_{\mu}k_{\nu}=0$). What has been shown so far is that wave solutions of Maxwell's equations, in the ray limit, must satisfy one of these two polynomial conditions. The tensors $\boldsymbol{\mathfrak{g}}_{\pm}^{-1}$ therefore determine the lightcone structures. The fact that there are two of them implies a double light cone structure - one for each of the two polarization states, i.e. birefringence. In vacuum, it is readily found that $\boldsymbol{\mathfrak{g}}_{+}^{-1} = \boldsymbol{\mathfrak{g}}_-^{-1} = \boldsymbol{g}^{-1}$ degenerates to the space-time metric. Since the $\boldsymbol{\mathfrak{g}}_{\pm}^{-1}$ determine the lightcones in media in the way that $\boldsymbol{g}^{-1}$ does for the vacuum, they are referred to as optical metrics. However, it is perhaps more appropriate to take the point of view that the space-time metric happens to also serve as the optical metric in vacuum, which is not so surprising considering that the space-time metric is the only available structure in vacuum. So far, no assumptions have been imposed on the form of $\boldsymbol{\varepsilon}, \boldsymbol{\mu}, \boldsymbol{\gamma}_e,$ or $\boldsymbol{\gamma}_h,$ so there are currently 36 freely specifiable parameters. To determine the optical metrics, Thompson imposes the conditions that $\boldsymbol{\gamma}_e$ and $\boldsymbol{\gamma}_h$ are antisymmetric with respect to $\boldsymbol{g}$ (i.e. antisymmetric when the indices on $\boldsymbol{\gamma}_e$ and $\boldsymbol{\gamma}_h$ are either both up or both down). The antisymmetry condition allows them to be written in the forms

$\boldsymbol{\gamma}_e = (\boldsymbol{h}\wedge\boldsymbol{u})\star\cdot\boldsymbol{\gamma}_{e1},$

$\boldsymbol{\gamma}_h = (\boldsymbol{\gamma}_{h1})^{\sharp}\cdot\star(\boldsymbol{u}\wedge\boldsymbol{h}).$

With this restriction, it is found that $P$ is biquadratic in $\boldsymbol{k}\cdot\boldsymbol{u}$ and can be factored to

$P = H_+H_-$

where

$H_{\pm} = \frac12 ( \boldsymbol{u}.\mathrm{adj}\left( \boldsymbol{\varepsilon} \right).\boldsymbol{u}^{\flat}) \left[( u^{\mu}u^{\nu} - \frac12 W_{\alpha}{}^{\alpha\mu\nu})k_{\mu}k_{\nu} \pm \sqrt{ \left(\frac12 W_{\alpha}{}^{\beta\mu\nu}W_{\beta}{}^{\alpha\sigma\rho} -\frac14 W_{\alpha}{}^{\alpha\mu\nu} W_{\beta}{}^{\beta\sigma\rho} \right) k_{\mu}k_{\nu}k_{\sigma}k_{\rho} } \right]$

with

$W_{\alpha}{}^{\kappa\mu\nu} =u^{\theta}u_{\pi}\delta^{\pi\lambda\kappa\rho}_{\theta\psi\beta\varphi} g_{\lambda\tau}\bar{\varepsilon}_{\sigma}{}^{\tau}g^{\sigma\psi} \bar{\mu}_{\alpha}{}^{\beta} g^{\eta\varphi} (\delta_{\rho}^{\mu} + (\gamma_{e1})_{\rho}{}u^{\mu}) (\delta_{\eta}^{\nu} + (\gamma_{h1})_{\eta}u^{\nu}).$

Finally, the optical metrics correspond to

$\boldsymbol{\mathfrak{g}}_{\pm}^{\mu\nu} = \frac{\partial^2 H_{\pm}}{\partial k_{\mu} \partial k_{\nu}}.$

The presence of the square root in $H_{\pm},$ and consequently in $\boldsymbol{\mathfrak{g}}_{\pm}^{-1},$ shows that the birefringent optical metrics are of the pseudo-Finslerian type. A key feature here is that the optical metric is not only a function of position, but also retains a dependency on $\boldsymbol{k}$. These pseudo-Finslerian optical metrics degenerate to a common, non-birefringent, pseudo-Riemannian optical metric for media that obey a curved space-time generalization of the Post conditions.
