= ER = EPR =

Conjecture unifying entanglement and wormholes

ER = EPR is a conjecture in physics stating that two entangled particles (a so-called Einstein–Podolsky–Rosen or EPR pair) are connected by a wormhole (of Einstein–Rosen bridge type) and is thought by some to be a basis for unifying general relativity and quantum mechanics into a theory of everything.

== Overview ==
The conjecture was proposed by Leonard Susskind and Juan Maldacena in 2013. They proposed that a wormhole (Einstein–Rosen bridge or ER bridge) is equivalent to a pair of maximally entangled black holes. EPR refers to quantum entanglement (EPR paradox).

The symbol is derived from the first letters of the surnames of authors who wrote the first paper on wormholes (Albert Einstein and Nathan Rosen) and the first paper on entanglement (Einstein, Boris Podolsky and Rosen). The two papers were published in 1935, but the authors did not claim any connection between the concepts.

=== Conjectured resolution ===
This is a conjectured resolution to the AMPS firewall paradox. Whether or not there is a firewall depends upon what is thrown into the other distant black hole. However, as the firewall lies inside the event horizon, no external superluminal signalling would be possible.

This conjecture is an extrapolation of the observation by Mark Van Raamsdonk that a maximally extended AdS-Schwarzschild black hole, which is a non-traversable wormhole, is dual to a pair of maximally entangled thermal conformal field theories via the AdS/CFT correspondence.

They backed up their conjecture by showing that the pair production of charged black holes in a background magnetic field leads to entangled black holes, but also, after Wick rotation, to a wormhole.

Susskind and Maldacena envisioned gathering up all the Hawking particles and smushing them together until they collapse into a black hole. That black hole would be entangled, and thus connected via wormhole, with the original black hole. That trick transformed a confusing mess of Hawking particles—paradoxically entangled with both a black hole and each other—into two black holes connected by a wormhole. Entanglement overload is averted, and the firewall problem goes away.

— Andrew Grant, "Entanglement: Gravity's long-distance connection", Science News

This conjecture sits uncomfortably with the linearity of quantum mechanics. An entangled state is a linear superposition of separable states. Presumably, separable states are not connected by any wormholes, but yet a superposition of such states is connected by a wormhole.

==== Generalizations to Unequal Mass and Charge ====
The original and most-studied formulation of the ER=EPR correspondence concerns the eternal Schwarzschild black hole, which is dual to two identical, entangled quantum systems described by the thermofield double (TFD) state. This idealized scenario involves two uncharged, non-rotating black holes of equal mass, connected by a perfectly symmetric, non-traversable Einstein-Rosen bridge. A significant question in the development of the conjecture is how this geometric connection manifests when the entangled black holes are not identical, for instance, having different masses ($M_1 \neq M_2$) or different electric charges ($Q_1 \neq Q_2$).

In such a scenario, the duality is expected to hold, but the geometry of the connecting wormhole is no longer a simple vacuum solution. The differences in the physical properties of the black holes act as a source of stress-energy that threads the interior of the wormhole.

From the quantum perspective, the two systems are no longer in the symmetric TFD state. Instead, they are described by a more general entangled state, sometimes called an asymmetric or "lopsided" thermofield double, which reflects the fact that the Hamiltonians governing the two black holes ($H_1$ and $H_2$) are different. The entanglement between the two black holes persists, but the perfect symmetry under interchange is broken.

From the geometric perspective, this asymmetry in the quantum state has a direct dual in the wormhole's structure:

- A difference in mass ($\Delta M = M_1 - M_2$) or charge ($\Delta Q = Q_1 - Q_2$) creates a non-zero stress-energy tensor $T_{\mu\nu}$ inside the wormhole. This can be visualized as a domain wall or a shockwave propagating through the wormhole's interior.
- This stress-energy causes the wormhole to be asymmetric. The geometry near one mouth (e.g., the curvature and the area of the horizon) will differ from the geometry near the other.
- The presence of this matter or energy inside the bridge generally causes it to collapse more quickly than in the vacuum case. The wormhole remains non-traversable, consistent with the preservation of causality, as the ER=EPR correspondence does not permit superluminal signaling.

Therefore, the ER=EPR conjecture robustly extends to the case of non-identical black holes. The entanglement is reflected in a geometric connection, but the wormhole is no longer a static, symmetric vacuum solution. Instead, it becomes a dynamic, asymmetric bridge containing a stress-energy field whose properties are dictated by the differences between the two entangled black holes.

The conjecture leads to a grander conjecture that the geometry of space, time and gravity is determined by entanglement.

==== Length of the ER bridge ====
A particularly powerful extension of the ER=EPR dictionary relates the internal geometry of the Einstein-Rosen bridge, specifically its spatial volume or "length," to the detailed phase information of the entangled quantum state. The standard, symmetric thermofield double (TFD) state, $|TFD\rangle = \sum_n e^{-\beta E_n/2} |n\rangle_L \otimes |n\rangle_R$, corresponds to the eternal black hole at the moment of time-reversal symmetry ($t=0$), which represents the shortest possible wormhole connecting the two exteriors. If a relative time evolution is applied to the two entangled systems, for example by evolving one side forward in time by $t_w$ to produce the state $|\Psi(t_w)\rangle = e^{-iH_L t_w} |TFD\rangle$, the entanglement entropy between the two sides remains unchanged, but relative phases $e^{-iE_n t_w}$ are introduced between the energy eigenstates in the superposition. The geometric dual of this phase-shifted state is a longer wormhole. The spatial volume of the ER bridge, $V$, grows linearly with the time parameter $t_w$ for a period that is exponential in the entropy of the black hole. This implies that the internal geometry of the wormhole is not merely a static representation of entanglement's existence, but a dynamic structure that precisely encodes the relative quantum phases of the state, with the wormhole's "length" acting as a geometric measure of the temporal offset or "computational time" separating the two entangled systems.
