= Mark Van Raamsdonk =

- Education: Princeton University
- Known for: Gravity and entanglement; EPR=ER
- Awards: 1st prize annual essay contest of the Gravity Research Foundation (2010)
- Scientific career
- Fields: Physics
- Workplaces: University of British Columbia; Stanford University; Princeton University
- Thesis: Making the most of zero branes and a weak background (2000)
- Doctoral advisor: Washington Taylor

Mark Van Raamsdonk is a professor at the Department of Physics and Astronomy at the University of British Columbia since 2002. Before that, he was a postdoc at Stanford University from 2000 until 2002 and studied as a graduate student at Princeton University from 1995 until 2000 when he received his PhD under the supervision of Washington Taylor. Before that, he did a combined mathematics/physics undergraduate degree at University of British Columbia where he graduated with what is believed to be the highest GPA in the university's prior history.

In 2009 Mark Van Raamsdonk started to work on the relationship between quantum mechanics and gravity during his first sabbatical year. He published his results "Building up spacetime with quantum entanglement" as an essay in 2010, which won the first prize of the annual essay contest run by the Gravity Research Foundation. Van Raamsdonk is a member of the "It from Qubit" collaboration, which was formed in 2015.

Mark Van Raamsdonk plays the saxophone and has organized a concert series at UBC, inspired by a similar one that existed during his time at Princeton.

In 2021, Van Raamsdonk published a short picture book titled "The Hot and Cold Adventures of Mr. Brick".

== Lecture notes ==
Mark van Raamsdonk, Lectures on Gravity and Entanglement, 2016.
