= Analog models of gravity =

Model of gravity using another physical system

Analog models of gravity are attempts to model various phenomena of general relativity (e.g., black holes or cosmological geometries) using other physical systems such as waves in a moving fluid and electromagnetic waves in a dielectric medium. These analogs (or analogies) serve to provide new ways of looking at problems, permit ideas from other realms of science to be applied, and may create opportunities for practical experiments within the analog that can be applied back to the source phenomena.

Analog models of gravity have been used in hundreds of published articles in the last decade.

== Bose–Einstein condensates ==
It has been shown that Bose–Einstein condensates (BEC) are a good platform to study analog gravity. Rotating black holes described by Kerr metric have been implemented in a BEC of exciton-polaritons (a quantum fluid of light).

== Gravity waves ==
Gravity waves have been recognized as a promising system for studying analog gravity models. Recent experiments have demonstrated that these waves can effectively simulate phase space horizons, drawing parallels to black hole physics. Specifically, the use of surface gravity water waves has enabled the observation of logarithmic phase singularities and the onset of Fermi–Dirac statistics, phenomena typically associated with quantum systems and gravitational theories. This approach provides valuable insights into the analogies between classical wave systems and quantum mechanical behaviors, expanding the possibilities for exploring gravitational analogs in a controlled laboratory environment.

== See also ==
- Acoustic metric
- Transformation optics
- Optical metric#Analogue gravity
- Optical black hole
- Sonic black hole
