= Ted Jacobson =

American physicist

- Born: November 27, 1954 (age 71)
- Education: University of Texas at Austin
- Known for: Quantum gravity
- Scientific career
- Fields: Theoretical physics
- Workplaces: University of Maryland
- Doctoral advisor: Cécile DeWitt-Morette

Theodore A. "Ted" Jacobson (born November 27, 1954) is an American theoretical physicist. He is known for his work on the connection between gravity and thermodynamics. In particular, in 1995 Jacobson proved that the Einstein field equations describing relativistic gravity can be derived from thermodynamic considerations.

Jacobson is professor of physics at the University of Maryland's Center for Fundamental Physics. His current research focuses on the dark energy problem and cosmic expansion.

== See also ==
- Entropic gravity
