= Black hole thermodynamics =

Concept in general relativity and quantum field theory

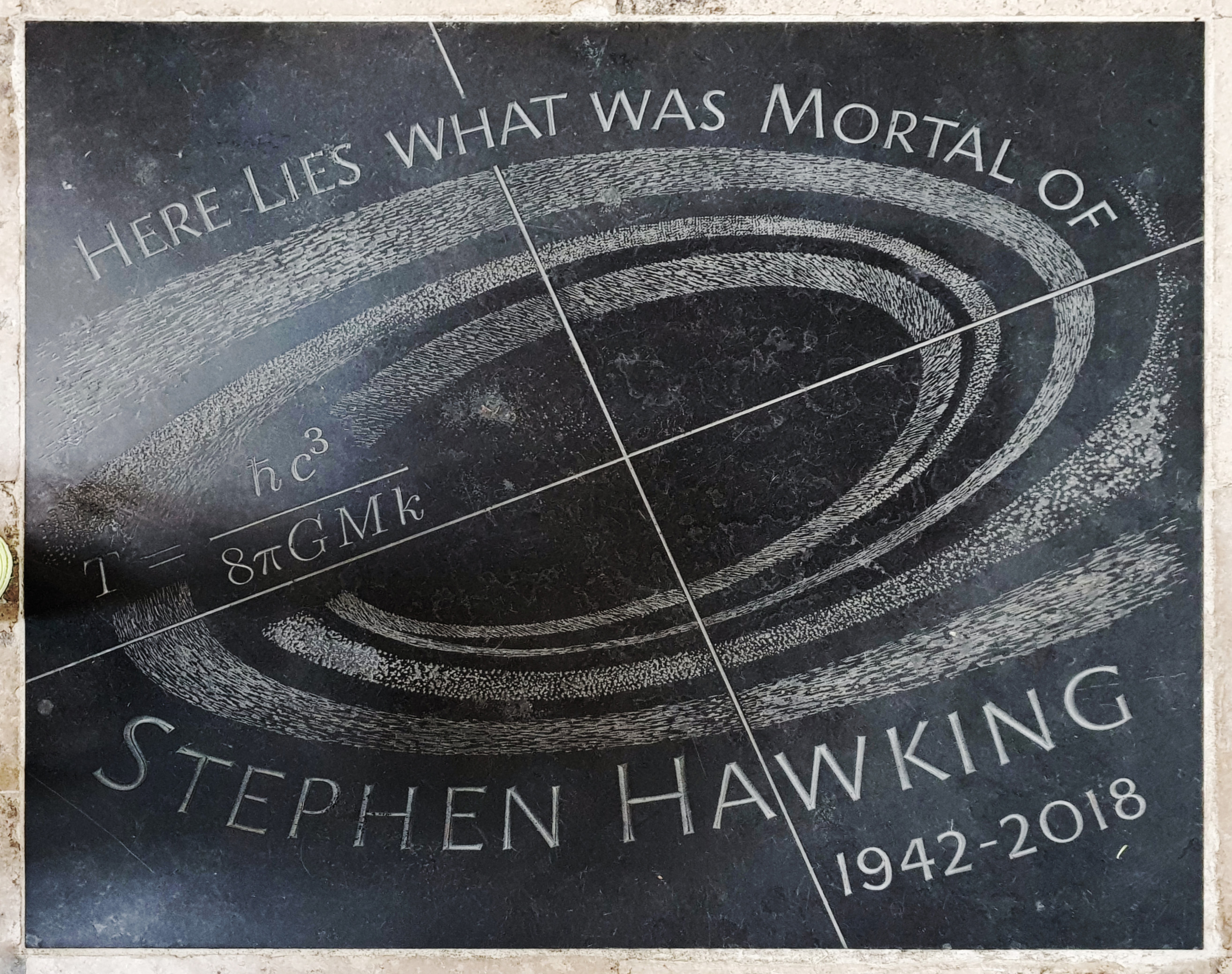
Stephen Hawking's memorial stone at Westminster Abbey, showing his formula for the temperature of a black hole

In physics, black hole thermodynamics is a set of physical relationships between the properties of black holes that stands in direct relationship to classical laws of thermodynamics. The equivalence is developed by replacing entropy with black hole horizon area and replacing temperature with black hole horizon surface gravity. Having temperature implies that a black hole must emit radiation, that is, Hawking radiation.

There is no known way to verify black hole thermodynamics; it is the most widely accepted physical model that combines general relativity, quantum field theory, and thermodynamics, though Hawking's area law has already been tested by analyzing gravitational waves.

== History ==
In 1972, Jacob Bekenstein conjectured that black holes should have an entropy proportional to the area of the event horizon, where by the same year, he proposed the no-hair theorem. In 1973 Bekenstein heuristically suggested $\frac{\ln{2}}{8\ \!\pi}\approx 0.0276$ as the constant of proportionality. The next year, in 1974, Stephen Hawking showed that black holes emit thermal Hawking radiation corresponding to a certain temperature (Hawking temperature). Using the thermodynamic relationship between energy, temperature and entropy, Hawking was able to confirm Bekenstein's conjecture and fix the constant of proportionality at $1/4$:

$$S_\text{BH} = \frac{k_\text{B} A}{4 {\ell_\text{P}}^2},$$

where $A$ is the area of the event horizon, $k_\text{B}$ is the Boltzmann constant, and $\ell_\text{P} = \sqrt{G\hbar / c^3}$ is the Planck length.

This is often referred to as the Bekenstein–Hawking formula. The subscript BH either stands for black hole or Bekenstein–Hawking. The fact that the black hole entropy is also the maximal entropy that can be obtained by the Bekenstein bound (wherein the Bekenstein bound becomes an equality) was the main observation that led to the holographic principle. This area relationship was generalized to arbitrary regions via the Ryu–Takayanagi formula, which relates the entanglement entropy of a boundary conformal field theory to a specific surface in its dual gravitational theory.

In the early 1990s Gerard 't Hooft and Leonard Susskind generalized the relationship between a black hole's surface area and its entropy, applying to all of spacetime. This was an early form of the holographic principle, a universal relationship between geometry and information. The idea is that the area surrounding any volume in spacetime limits the information content of the volume. Thus the number of degrees of freedom in any volume is bounded and not infinite.

Although Hawking's calculations gave further thermodynamic evidence for black hole entropy, until 1995 no one was able to make a controlled calculation of black hole entropy based on statistical mechanics, which associates entropy with a large number of microstates. Some work, called no-hair theorems, suggested that black holes could have only a single microstate. The situation changed in 1995 when Andrew Strominger and Cumrun Vafa calculated the Bekenstein–Hawking entropy of a supersymmetric black hole in string theory, using methods based on D-branes and string duality. Their calculation was followed by many similar computations of entropy of large classes of other extremal and near-extremal black holes, and the result always agreed with the Bekenstein–Hawking formula. However, for the Schwarzschild black hole, viewed as the furthest-from-extremal black hole, the relationship between micro- and macrostates has not been characterized. Efforts to develop an adequate answer within the framework of string theory continue.

In loop quantum gravity (LQG) it is possible to associate a geometrical interpretation with the microstates: these are the quantum geometries of the horizon. LQG offers a geometric explanation of the finiteness of the entropy and of the proportionality of the area of the horizon. It is possible to derive, from the covariant formulation of full quantum theory (spin foam), the correct relation between energy and area (first law), the Unruh temperature and the distribution that yields Hawking entropy. The calculation makes use of the notion of dynamical horizon and is done for non-extremal black holes. There seems to be also discussed the calculation of Bekenstein–Hawking entropy from the point of view of LQG. The current accepted microstate ensemble for black holes is the microcanonical ensemble. The partition function for black holes results in a negative heat capacity. In canonical ensembles, there is limitation for a positive heat capacity, whereas microcanonical ensembles can exist at a negative heat capacity.

Analyses of gravitational waves emitted by GW250114 confirmed Hawking's assertion that the surface area of a black hole is a non-decreasing function of time.

== Laws of classical black hole mechanics ==
These four laws of black hole mechanics are relationships between physical properties of black holes assuming general relativity but no quantum effects. This form is analogous to the laws of thermodynamics but without quantum effects the black hole temperature must be zero and simply absorbs all radiation. This is the form proposed by Bardeen, Brandon Carter, and Hawking in 1973 (expressed in geometrized units).

=== Zeroth law ===
For a stationary black hole (one in mechanical equilibrium) the surface gravity, $\kappa$, is constant on the event horizon. This is the analog of the zeroth law of thermodynamics on the equivalence of temperature across a system at equilibrium with surface gravity being analogous to temperature.

=== First law ===
For perturbations of stationary black holes, the change of energy is related to change of area, angular momentum, and electric charge by

$$dE = \frac{\kappa}{8\pi}\,dA + \Omega\,dJ + \Phi\,dQ,$$

where $E$ is the energy, $\kappa$ is the surface gravity, $A$ is the horizon area, $\Omega$ is the angular velocity, $J$ is the angular momentum, $\Phi$ is the electrostatic potential and $Q$ is the electric charge. Analogously, the first law of thermodynamics is a statement of energy conservation, which contains on its right side a term equal to temperature times change in entropy, $T dS$.

=== Second law ===
The horizon area is, assuming the weak energy condition, a non-decreasing function of time:

$$\frac{dA}{dt} \geq 0.$$
Here black hole surface area is analogous to thermodynamic entropy and the laws say these properties can never spontaneously decrease.

=== Third law ===
It is not possible to form a black hole with vanishing surface gravity. That is, $\kappa = 0$ cannot be achieved. This is analogous to some but not all forms of the third law of thermodynamics.

=== Quantum effects ===
The generalized second law of thermodynamics (GSL) is needed to present the second law of thermodynamics as valid. This is because the second law of thermodynamics, as a result of the disappearance of entropy near the exterior of black holes, is not useful. The GSL allows for the application of the law because it allows for the measurement of interior, common entropy. The validity of the GSL can be established by studying an example, such as looking at a system having entropy that falls into a bigger, non-moving black hole, and establishing upper and lower entropy bounds for the increase in the black hole entropy and entropy of the system, respectively. The GSL also holds for theories of gravity such as general relativity, Lovelock gravity, or braneworld gravity, because the conditions to use it for these theories can be met.

However, on the topic of black hole formation, the question becomes whether or not the generalized second law of thermodynamics will be valid, and if it is, it will have been proved valid for all situations. Because black hole formation is not a stationary event, proving that the GSL holds is difficult. Proving it is generally valid would require quantum-statistical mechanics, because the GSL is both a quantum and statistical law. This discipline does not exist so the GSL can be assumed to be useful in general, as well as for prediction. For example, one can use the GSL to predict that, for a cold, non-rotating assembly of $N$ nucleons, $S_\text{BH} - S > 0$, where $S_\text{BH}$ is the entropy of a black hole and $S$ is the sum of the ordinary entropy.

==== Third law ====
The third law of black hole thermodynamics is controversial. Specific counterexamples called extremal black holes fail to obey the rule. The classical third law of thermodynamics, or Nernst's theorem, which says the entropy of a system must go to zero as the temperature goes to absolute zero, is also not a universal law. However, systems that fail the classical third law have not been realized in practice, leading to the suggestion that the extremal black holes may not represent the physics of black holes generally.

A weaker form of the classical third law known as the unattainability principle states that an infinite number of steps are required to put a system into its ground state. This form of the third law does have an analog in black hole physics.

=== Interpretation of the laws ===
The four laws of black hole mechanics suggest that one should identify the surface gravity of a black hole with temperature and the area of the event horizon with entropy, at least up to some multiplicative constants. If black holes are only considered classically, then they have zero temperature, and by the no-hair theorem, zero entropy, and the laws of black hole mechanics remain an analogy. However, when quantum-mechanical effects are taken into account, it is found that black holes emit thermal radiation (Hawking radiation) at the Hawking temperature

$$T_\text{H} = \frac{\kappa}{2\pi}.$$

From the first law of black hole mechanics, this determines the multiplicative constant of the Bekenstein–Hawking entropy, which is (in geometrized units)

$$S_\text{BH} = \frac{A}{4}.$$

which is the entropy of the black hole in Einstein's general relativity. Quantum field theory in curved spacetime can be utilized to calculate the entropy for a black hole in any covariant theory for gravity, known as the Wald entropy.

== Critique ==
While black hole thermodynamics (BHT) has been regarded as one of the deepest clues to a quantum theory of gravity, there remains criticism that "the analogy is not nearly as good as is commonly supposed", that it "is often based on a kind of caricature of thermodynamics" and "it's unclear what the systems in BHT are supposed to be".

Others have come to the opposite conclusion believing, "stationary black holes are not analogous to thermodynamic systems: they are thermodynamic systems, in the fullest sense."

== See also ==
- Joseph Polchinski
- Robert Wald
