= Hawking radiation =

Hypothetical astrophysical effect

Hawking radiation is radiation released outside a black hole's event horizon due to quantum effects according to a model developed by Stephen Hawking in 1974. This black-body radiation was not predicted by previous models which assumed that once electromagnetic radiation is inside the event horizon, it cannot escape. Hawking radiation is predicted to be extremely faint and is many orders of magnitude below the current best telescopes' detecting ability.

Hawking radiation would reduce the mass and rotational energy of black holes and consequently cause black hole evaporation. Because of this, black holes that do not gain mass through other means are expected to shrink and ultimately vanish. For all except the smallest black holes, this happens extremely slowly. The radiation temperature, called Hawking temperature, is inversely proportional to the black hole's mass, so micro black holes are predicted to be larger emitters of radiation than larger black holes and should dissipate faster per their mass. Consequently, if small black holes exist, as permitted by the hypothesis of primordial black holes, they will lose mass more rapidly as they shrink, leading to a final cataclysm of high energy radiation alone. Such radiation bursts have not yet been detected.

== Background ==
Picture of space falling into a Schwarzschild black hole at the Newtonian escape speed. Outside the horizon (red), the infalling speed is less than the speed of light; inside it is greater. At the event horizon, the infalling speed equals the speed of light. Credit: Andrew Hamilton, JILA

Modern black holes were first predicted using Albert Einstein's general theory of relativity. Evidence of the astrophysical objects termed black holes began to mount half a century later, and these objects are of current interest primarily because of their compact size and immense gravitational attraction. Early research into black holes was done by individuals such as Karl Schwarzschild and John Wheeler, who modeled black holes as having zero entropy.

A black hole can form when enough matter or energy is compressed into a volume small enough that the escape velocity is greater than the speed of light. Because nothing can travel that fast, nothing within a certain distance, proportional to the mass of the black hole, can escape beyond that distance. The region beyond which not even light can escape is the event horizon: an observer outside it cannot observe, become aware of, or be affected by events within the event horizon.

Alternatively, using a set of infalling coordinates in general relativity, one can conceptualize the event horizon as the region beyond which space is falling faster than the speed of light. (Although nothing can travel through space faster than light, space itself can fall at any speed.) Once matter is inside the event horizon, all of the matter inside falls inevitably into a gravitational singularity, a place of infinite curvature and zero size, leaving behind a warped spacetime devoid of any matter; a classical black hole is pure empty spacetime, and the simplest (non-rotating and uncharged) is characterized just by its mass and event horizon.

== Discovery ==
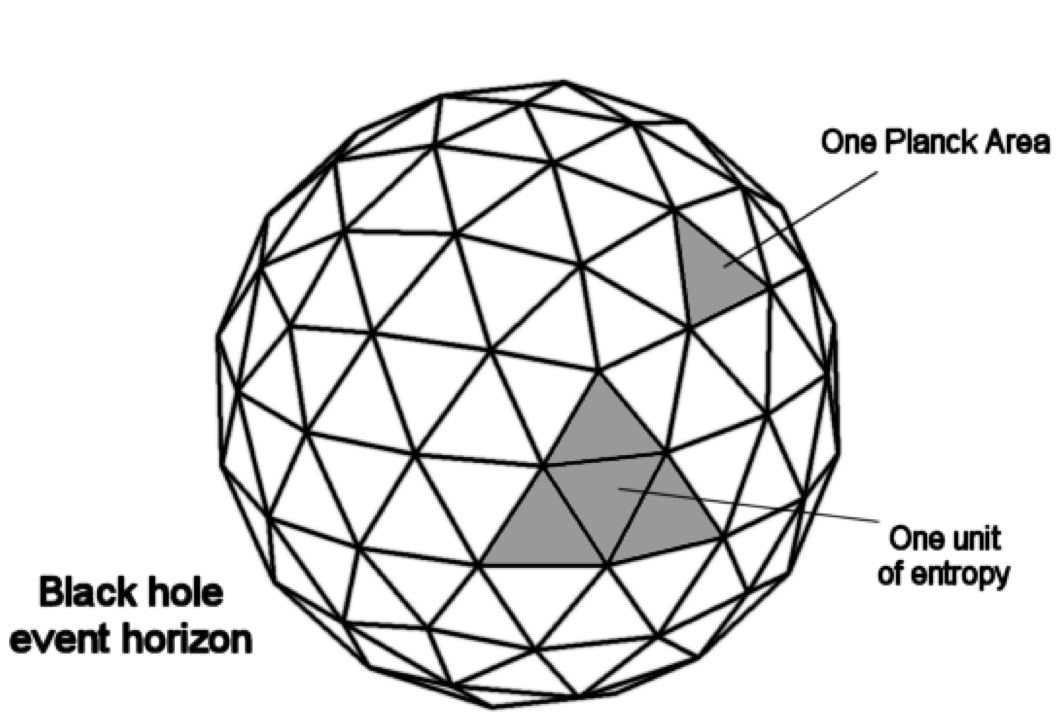
Diagram by Jacob Bekenstein of the entropy on a black hole's event horizon.

In 1971, Soviet physicsists Yakov Zeldovich and Alexei Starobinsky proposed that rotating black holes ought to create and emit particles, reasoning by analogy with electromagnetic spinning metal spheres. The process is now called Zeldovich amplification. In 1972, Jacob Bekenstein developed a theory and reported that the black holes should have an entropy proportional to their surface area. Initially Stephen Hawking argued against Bekenstein's theory, viewing black holes as a simple object with no entropy. After meeting Zeldovich in Moscow in 1973, Hawking put these two ideas together using his mixture of quantum field theory and general relativity.

In his 1974 paper Hawking showed that in theory, a black hole radiates particles as if it were a blackbody. Particles escaping effectively drain energy from the black hole. In Hawking's prediction, black holes emit small amounts of thermal radiation at temperature
$$T = \frac{\hbar c^3}{8 \pi GMk_\mathrm{B}},$$
where ${\hbar}$ is the reduced Planck constant, $c$ is the speed of light, $G$ is the gravitational constant, $M$ is the mass of the black hole and $k_\mathrm{B}$ is the Boltzmann constant. By applying quantum field theory to black holes, Hawking determined that a black hole should continuously emit thermal blackbody radiation. This effect has become known as Hawking radiation. This theory was supported by previous work by Jacob Bekenstein, who theorized that black holes should have a finite entropy proportional to their surface area, and therefore should also have a temperature. Due to Bekenstein's contribution to black hole entropy, it is also known as Bekenstein–Hawking radiation. Since Hawking's 1974 publication, he and others have mathematically verified the result through different approaches, such as by path integrals.

Hawking radiation derives from vacuum fluctuations. A vacuum fluctuation in the electromagnetic field can result in a photon outside of the black hole horizon paired with one on the inside. The horizon allows one to escape in each direction.

== Emission process ==
Hawking radiation is dependent on the Unruh effect and the equivalence principle applied to black-hole horizons. Close to the event horizon of a black hole, a local observer must accelerate to keep from falling in. An accelerating observer sees a thermal bath of particles that pop out of the local acceleration horizon, turn around, and free-fall back in. The condition of local thermal equilibrium implies that the consistent extension of this local thermal bath has a finite temperature at infinity, which implies that some of these particles emitted by the horizon are not reabsorbed and become outgoing Hawking radiation.

A Schwarzschild black hole has a metric
$$(ds)^2 = -\left(1 - \frac{2M}{r}\right)\,(dt)^2 + \frac{1}{\left(1 - \frac{2M}{r}\right)} \,(dr)^2 + r^2\,(d\Omega)^2.$$

The black hole is the background spacetime for a quantum field theory.

The field theory is defined by a local path integral, so if the boundary conditions at the horizon are determined, the state of the field outside will be specified. To find the appropriate boundary conditions, consider a stationary observer just outside the horizon at position
$$r = 2M + \frac{\rho^2}{8M}.$$

The local metric to lowest order is
$$\begin{align} (ds)^2
&= -\left(\frac{\rho}{4M}\right)^2 \,(dt)^2 + (d\rho)^2 + (dX_\perp)^2 \\
&= -\rho^2 \,(d\tau)^2 + (d\rho)^2 + (dX_\perp)^2,
\end{align}$$
which is the Rindler coordinates in terms of $\textstyle \tau = \frac{t}{4M}$. The metric describes a frame that is accelerating to keep from falling into the black hole. The local acceleration, $\textstyle \alpha = \frac {1}{\rho}$, diverges as $\rho \rightarrow 0$.

The horizon is not a special boundary, and objects can fall in. So the local observer should feel accelerated in ordinary Minkowski space by the principle of equivalence. The near-horizon observer must see the field excited at a local temperature
$$T = \frac{\alpha}{2\pi} = \frac{1}{2\pi\rho} = \frac{1}{4\pi\sqrt{2Mr\left(1 - \frac{2M}{r}\right)}},$$
which is the Unruh effect.

The gravitational redshift is given by the square root of the time component of the metric. So for the field theory state to consistently extend, there must be a thermal background everywhere with the local temperature redshift-matched to the near horizon temperature:
$$\begin{align} T(r')
&= \frac{1}{4\pi\sqrt{2Mr\left(1 - \frac{2M}{r}\right)}} \cdot \frac{\sqrt{1 - \frac{2M}{r}}}{\sqrt{1 - \frac{2M}{r'}}} \\
&= \frac{1}{4\pi\sqrt{2Mr\left(1 - \frac{2M}{r'}\right)}}.
\end{align}$$

The inverse temperature redshifted to $r'$ at infinity is
$$T(\infty) = \frac{1}{4 \pi \sqrt{2 M r}},$$
and r is the near-horizon position, near $2M$, so this is really
$$T(\infty) = \frac{1}{8 \pi M}.$$

Thus a field theory defined on a black-hole background is in a thermal state whose temperature at infinity is
$$T_\text{H} = \frac{1}{8 \pi M}.$$

For a black hole mass equal to the Earth, this temperature would be 10^{−12} K. The wavelength of a typical quantum of Hawking radiation is similar to the size of the black hole.

From the black-hole temperature, it is straightforward to calculate the black-hole entropy $S$. The change in entropy when a quantity of heat $dQ$ is added is
$$dS = \frac{dQ}{T} = 8 \pi M \,{d}Q.$$

The heat energy that enters serves to increase the total mass, so
$$dS = 8 \pi M \,{d}M = d(4 \pi M^2).$$

So the entropy of a black hole is proportional to its surface area:
$$S = 4 \pi M^2 = \frac{A}{4},$$
where, since the radius of the black hole is twice its mass, we have the area $A$ being given by
$$A = 4 \pi R^2= 16 \pi M^2.$$

Assuming that a small black hole has zero entropy, the integration constant is zero. Forming a black hole is the most efficient way to compress mass into a region, and this entropy is also a bound on the information content of any sphere in space time. The form of the result strongly suggests that the physical description of a gravitating theory can be somehow encoded (by the holographic principle) onto a bounding surface.

== Greybody factors ==
Greybody factors are functions of frequency and angular momentum that characterize the deviation of the emission-spectrum of a black hole from a pure black-body spectrum. As a result of quantum effects, an isolated black hole emits radiation that, at the black-hole horizon, matches the radiation from a perfect black body. The rate at which a black hole emits particles with energy between $\hbar \omega$ and $\hbar (\omega + d \omega)$ and with angular momentum quantum numbers $\ell, m$ is given by
$$d\Gamma = \frac{\sigma_{\omega, \ell, m}}{\exp\left(\frac{\hbar \omega}{k_\mathrm{B} T}\right) \pm 1} \,{d}\omega$$
where $k_\mathrm{B}$ is the Boltzmann constant and $T$ is the Hawking temperature of the black hole. The constant in the denominator is 1 for Bosons and −1 for Fermions. The factors $\sigma_{\omega, \ell, m}$ are called the greybody factors of the black hole. For a charged black hole, these factors may also depend on the charge of the emitted particles.

== Black hole evaporation ==
When particles escape, the black hole loses a small amount of its energy and therefore some of its mass (mass and energy are related by Einstein's equation of mass–energy equivalence, $E = mc^2$). Consequently, an evaporating black hole will have a finite lifespan. By dimensional analysis, the life span of a black hole can be shown to scale as the cube of its initial mass. The time that the black hole takes to dissipate is:
$$t_\mathrm{ev} = \frac{5120 \pi G^2 M^3}{\hbar c^4} = \frac{480 c^2 V}{\hbar G} = 5120\pi\,t_{\text{P}}\left(\frac{M}{m_{\text{P}}}\right)^{3} \approx 2.140\times10^{67}\,\text{years} \ \left(\frac{M}{M_\odot}\right)^3,$$
where $M$ and $V$ are the mass and volume of the (Schwarzschild) black hole, $m_\mathrm{P}$ the Planck mass and $t_\mathrm{P}$ Planck time. A black hole of one solar mass (M_{☉} = 2.0×10^{30} kg) takes more than 10^{67} years to evaporate—much longer than the current age of the universe at 1.4×10^{10} years.

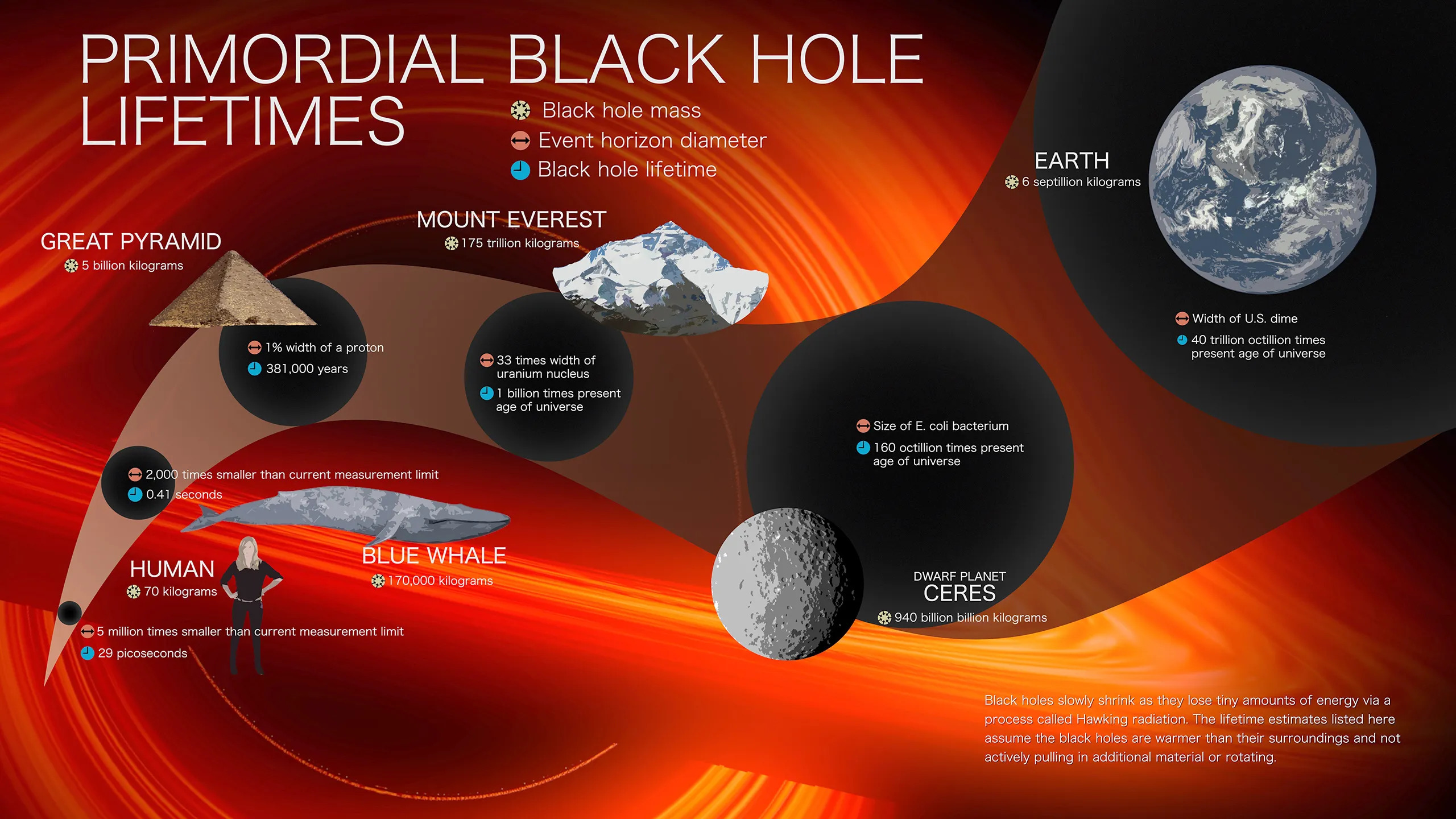
Black hole evaporation takes a long time relative to the current age of the universe, for black holes larger than a proton in diameter.

The Hawking radiation temperature is:

$$T_\mathrm{H} = \frac{\hbar c^3}{8 \pi G M k_\mathrm{B}} \approx \frac{10^{23}}{M}.$$
Larger mass black holes have lower Hawking radiation temperatures. For the smallest predicted stellar black hole, about 3 solar masses, this temperature is 10^{−7} K. Since the universe contains the cosmic microwave background radiation at 2.7 K, no stellar black holes can evaporate: they are colder than outer space.

The Bekenstein–Hawking luminosity of a black hole, under the assumption of pure photon emission (i.e. that no other particles are emitted) and under the assumption that the horizon is the radiating surface is:
$$P = \frac{\hbar c^6}{15360 \pi G^2 M^2}$$
where $P$ is the luminosity or radiated power, $\hbar$ is the reduced Planck constant, $c$ is the speed of light in a vacuum, $G$ is the gravitational constant, and $M$ is the mass of the black hole.

Black hole evaporation has several significant consequences:

- Black hole evaporation produces a more consistent view of black hole thermodynamics by showing how black holes interact thermally with the rest of the universe.
- Unlike most objects, a black hole's temperature increases as it radiates away mass. The rate of temperature increase is exponential, with the most likely endpoint being the dissolution of the black hole in a violent burst of gamma rays. A complete description of this dissolution requires a model of quantum gravity, however, as it occurs when the black hole's mass approaches 1 Planck mass, its radius will also approach two Planck lengths.
- The simplest models of black hole evaporation lead to the black hole information paradox. The information content of a black hole appears to be lost when it dissipates, as under these models the Hawking radiation is random (it has no relation to the original information). A number of solutions to this problem have been proposed, including suggestions that Hawking radiation is perturbed to contain the missing information, that the Hawking evaporation leaves some form of remnant particle containing the missing information, and that information is allowed to be lost under these conditions.

=== Evaporation of primordial black holes ===
The relationship between mass and temperature for Hawking radiation then implies the mass would need to be less than 0.8% of the mass of the Earth. This in turn means any black hole that could dissipate cannot be one created by stellar collapse. Only primordial black holes might be created with this little mass.

Hawking estimated that any black hole formed in the early universe with a mass of less than approximately 10^{12} kg would have evaporated completely by the present day.

In 1976, Don Page refined this estimate by calculating the power produced, and the time to evaporation, for a non-rotating, non-charged Schwarzschild black hole of mass $M$. The calculations are complicated by the fact that a black hole, being of finite size, is not a perfect black body; the absorption cross section goes down in a complicated, spin-dependent manner as frequency decreases, especially when the wavelength becomes comparable to the size of the event horizon. Page concluded that primordial black holes could survive to the present day only if their initial mass were roughly 4×10^{11} kg or larger. Writing in 1976, Page using the understanding of neutrinos at the time erroneously worked on the assumption that neutrinos have no mass and that only two neutrino flavors exist, and therefore his results of black hole lifetimes do not match the modern results which take into account 3 flavors of neutrinos with nonzero masses. A 2008 calculation using the particle content of the Standard Model and the WMAP figure for the age of the universe yielded a mass bound of (5.00±0.04)×10^{11} kg.

Some pre-1998 calculations, using outdated assumptions about neutrinos, were as follows: If black holes evaporate under Hawking radiation, a solar mass black hole will evaporate over 10^{64} years which is vastly longer than the age of the universe. A supermassive black hole with a mass of 10^{11} M_{☉} will evaporate in around 2×10^{100} years. Some monster black holes in the universe are predicted to continue to grow up to perhaps 10^{14} M_{☉} during the collapse of superclusters of galaxies. Even these would evaporate over a timescale of up to 2×10^{106} years. Post-1998 science modifies these results slightly; for example, the modern estimate of a solar-mass black hole lifetime is 10^{67} years.

== Problems and extensions ==
=== Trans-Planckian problem ===
The trans-Planckian problem is the issue that Hawking's original calculation includes quantum particles where the wavelength becomes shorter than the Planck length near the black hole's horizon. This is due to the peculiar behavior there, where time stops as measured from far away. A particle emitted from a black hole with a finite frequency, if traced back to the horizon, must have had an infinite frequency, and therefore a trans-Planckian wavelength.

The Unruh effect and the Hawking effect both talk about field modes in the superficially stationary spacetime that change frequency relative to other coordinates that are regular across the horizon. This is necessarily so, since to stay outside a horizon requires acceleration that constantly Doppler shifts the modes.

An outgoing photon of Hawking radiation, if the mode is traced back in time, has a frequency that diverges from that which it has at great distance, as it gets closer to the horizon, which requires the wavelength of the photon to "scrunch up" infinitely at the horizon of the black hole. In a maximally extended external Schwarzschild solution, that photon's frequency stays regular only if the mode is extended back into the past region where no observer can go, so Hawking used a different black hole solution without a past region, one that forms at a finite time in the past. In that case, the source of all the outgoing photons can be identified: a microscopic point right at the moment that the black hole first formed.

The quantum fluctuations at that tiny point, in Hawking's original calculation, contain all the outgoing radiation. The modes that eventually contain the outgoing radiation at long times are redshifted by such a huge amount by their long sojourn next to the event horizon that they start off as modes with a wavelength much shorter than the Planck length. Since the laws of physics at such short distances are unknown, some find Hawking's original calculation unconvincing.

The trans-Planckian problem is nowadays mostly considered a mathematical artifact of horizon calculations. The same effect occurs for regular matter falling onto a white hole solution. Matter that falls on the white hole accumulates on it, but has no future region into which it can go. Tracing the future of this matter, it is compressed onto the final singular endpoint of the white hole evolution, into a trans-Planckian region. The reason for these types of divergences is that modes that end at the horizon from the point of view of outside coordinates are singular in frequency there. The only way to determine what happens classically is to extend in some other coordinates that cross the horizon.

There exist alternative physical pictures that give the Hawking radiation in which the trans-Planckian problem is addressed. The key point is that similar trans-Planckian problems occur when the modes occupied with Unruh radiation are traced back in time. In the Unruh effect, the magnitude of the temperature can be calculated from ordinary Minkowski field theory, and is not controversial.

=== Large extra dimensions ===
The formulas from the previous section are applicable only if the laws of gravity are approximately valid all the way down to the Planck scale. In particular, for black holes with masses below the Planck mass (~10^{−8} kg), they result in impossible lifetimes below the Planck time (~10^{−43} s). This is normally seen as an indication that the Planck mass is the lower limit on the mass of a black hole.

In a model with large extra dimensions (10 or 11), the values of Planck constants can be radically different, and the formulas for Hawking radiation have to be modified as well. In particular, the lifetime of a micro black hole with a radius below the scale of the extra dimensions is given by
$$\tau \sim \frac{1}{M_*} \left( \frac{M_\text{BH}}{M_*} \right)^\frac{n+3}{n+1},$$

where $M_*$ is the low-energy scale, which could be as low as a few TeV, and $n$ is the number of large extra dimensions. This formula is now consistent with black holes as light as a few TeV, with lifetimes on the order of the "new Planck time" ~10^{−26} s.

=== In loop quantum gravity ===
A detailed study of the quantum geometry of a black hole event horizon has been made using loop quantum gravity. Loop-quantization does not reproduce the result for black hole entropy originally discovered by Bekenstein and Hawking, unless the value of a free parameter is set to cancel out various constants such that the Bekenstein–Hawking entropy formula is reproduced. However, quantum gravitational corrections to the entropy and radiation of black holes have been computed based on the theory.

Based on the fluctuations of the horizon area, a quantum black hole exhibits deviations from the Hawking radiation spectrum that would be observable were X-rays from Hawking radiation of evaporating primordial black holes to be observed. The quantum effects are centered at a set of discrete and unblended frequencies highly pronounced on top of the Hawking spectrum.

=== Tunneling picture ===
An alternative description of the Hawking effect as a tunneling process has been developed by Parikh and Wilczek, and by Padmanabhan and Srinivasan. In this approach, the probability of tunneling through the horizon is compared with a Boltzmann distribution, leading to the same temperature as in Hawking's original derivation. Owing to its local formulation, the tunneling picture can be applied to various types of horizons, including mildly dynamical ones.

== Empirical observation ==
=== Astronomy ===
In June 2008, NASA launched the Fermi space telescope, which is searching for the terminal gamma-ray flashes expected from evaporating primordial black holes. As of January 2024, none have been detected.

Neutrino detector KM3NeT observed a 120 PeV event labeled KM3-230213A in 2023; one of the proposed explanations is evaporation of a primordial black hole. A broad range of measurements at KM3NeT and IceCube are consistent with primordial black hole evaporation assuming such primordial black holes account for a significant fraction of dark matter.

=== Particle physics ===
If speculative large extra dimension theories are correct, then CERN's Large Hadron Collider may be able to create micro black holes and observe their evaporation. No such micro black hole has been observed at CERN.

=== Laboratory experiments ===
Under experimentally achievable conditions for gravitational systems, this effect is too small to be observed directly. It was predicted that Hawking radiation could be studied by analogy using sonic black holes, in which sound perturbations are analogous to light in a gravitational black hole and the flow of an approximately perfect fluid is analogous to gravity. (See analog models of gravity.) Observations of Hawking radiation were reported in sonic black holes employing Bose–Einstein condensates.

In September 2010 an experimental setup created a laboratory "white hole event horizon" that the experimenters claimed was shown to radiate an optical analog to Hawking radiation. However, the results remain debated, and the experiment's status as a genuine confirmation remains in doubt.

== See also ==
- Black hole information paradox
- Black hole starship
- Blandford–Znajek process and Penrose process, other extractions of black-hole energy
- Gibbons–Hawking effect
