= Black hole =

Compact astronomical body

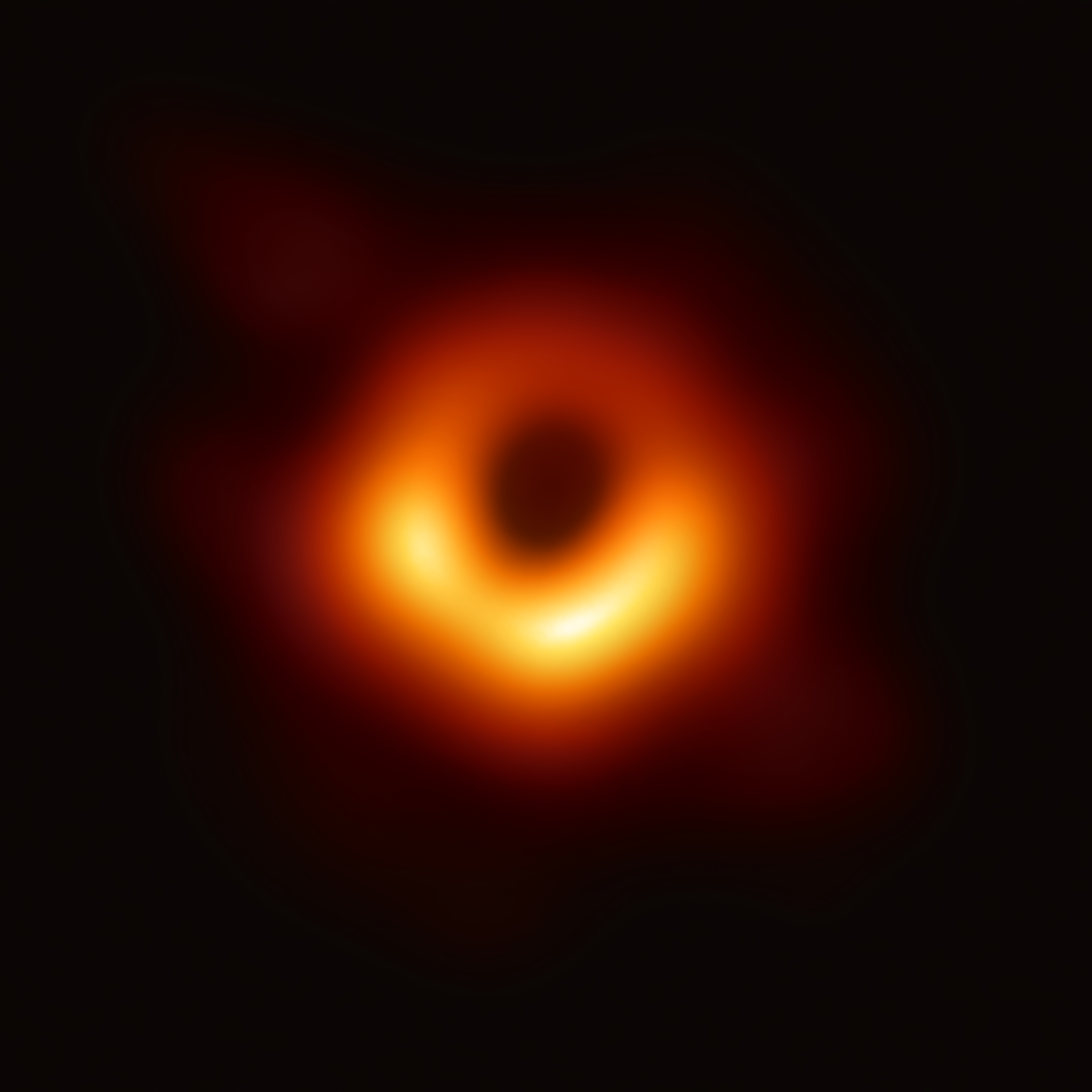
An image of the core region of Messier 87, a supermassive black hole, processed from an array of eight radio telescopes known as the EHT with colours indicating brightness temperature

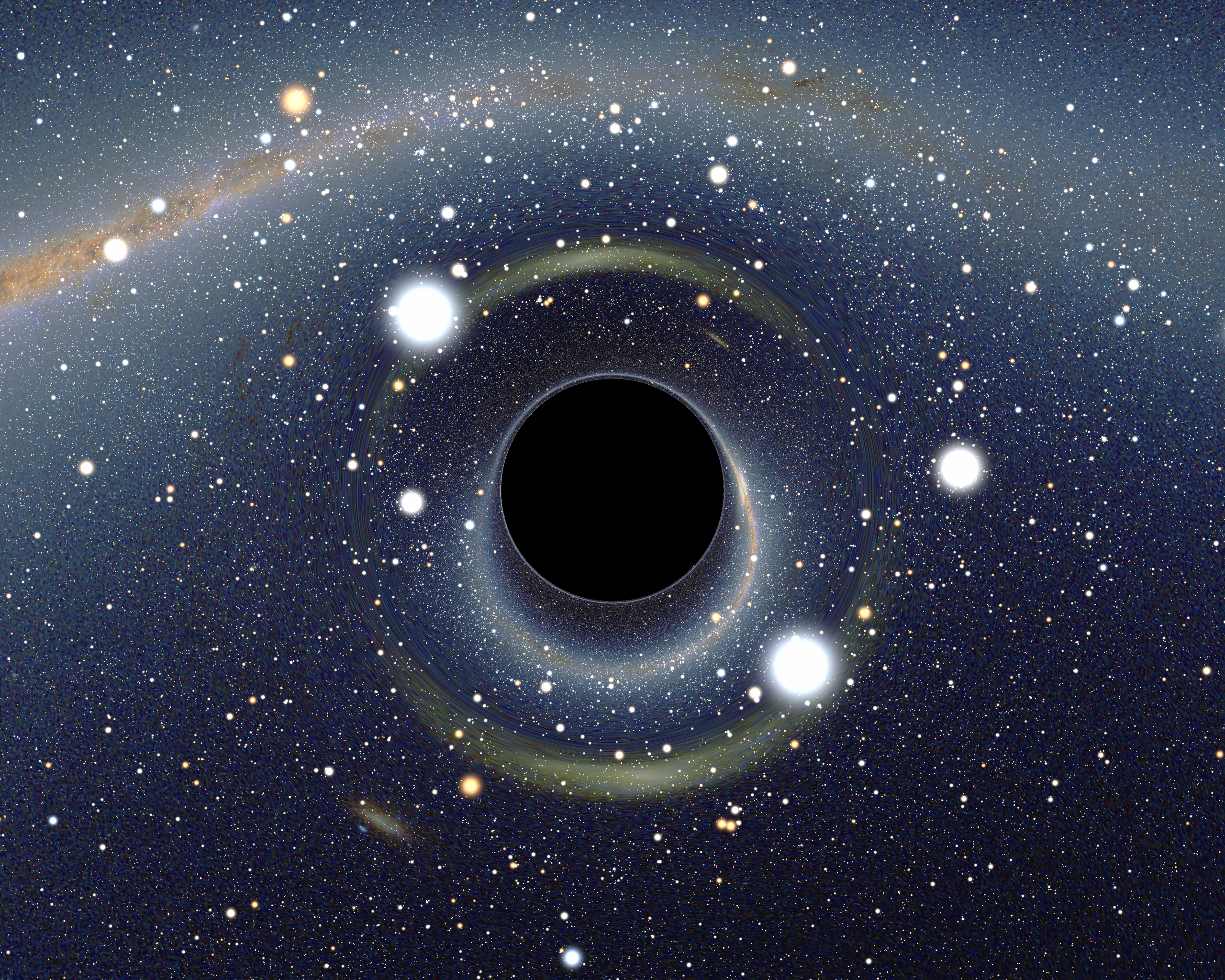
Simulated view of a nonspinning, uncharged black hole in front of the Large Magellanic Cloud. The gravitational lensing effect produces two enlarged but distorted views of the Cloud. Across the top, the Milky Way disk appears distorted into an arc. Based on ray tracing.

A black hole is an astronomical body so compact that its gravity prevents anything, including light, from escaping. Albert Einstein's theory of general relativity, which describes gravitation as the curvature of spacetime, predicts that any sufficiently compact mass will form a black hole. The boundary of no escape is called the event horizon. In general relativity, crossing a black hole's event horizon traps an object inside but produces no locally detectable change. General relativity also predicts that every black hole should have a central singularity, where the curvature of spacetime is infinite.

Objects whose gravitational fields are too strong for light to escape were first considered in the 18th century. In 1916, the first solution of general relativity that would characterise a black hole was found. By the late 1950s, this solution began to be interpreted physically as a region of space from which nothing can escape. Black holes were long considered a mathematical curiosity; it was not until the 1960s that theoretical work showed they were a generic prediction of general relativity. The first widely accepted black hole was Cygnus X-1, an x-ray source proposed as a black hole binary through several studies between 1971 and 1974.

Black holes typically form as part of a supernova event when massive stars collapse at the end of their life cycle. After a black hole has formed, it can grow by absorbing mass from its surroundings. Supermassive black holes of millions of solar masses may form by absorbing stars and merging with other black holes, or via direct collapse of gas clouds. There is consensus that supermassive black holes exist in the centres of most galaxies.

Quantum field theory in curved spacetime predicts that event horizons emit Hawking radiation, with the rate of emission being inversely proportional to the mass. This causes the black hole to lose mass very slowly, provided it is not accreting matter. However, even the smallest class of black holes observed, stellar black holes, are gaining mass from the cosmic microwave background faster than they are losing mass via Hawking radiation.

The presence of a black hole can be inferred through its interaction with matter and electromagnetic radiation such as visible light. Matter falling toward a black hole can form an accretion disk of infalling plasma, heated by friction and emitting light. In extreme cases, this creates a quasar, some of the brightest objects in the universe. Merging black holes can be detected by the gravitational waves they emit. If stars are orbiting a black hole, their motions can be used to determine the black hole's mass and location. In this way, astronomers have identified numerous stellar black hole candidates in binary systems and established that the radio source known as Sagittarius A*, at the core of the Milky Way galaxy, contains a supermassive black hole of about 4.3 million solar masses.

== History ==
The idea of a body so massive that even light could not escape was first proposed in the late 18th century by English astronomer and clergyman John Michell and independently by French scientist Pierre-Simon Laplace. Both scholars proposed very large stars in contrast to the modern concept of an extremely dense object.

Michell's idea, in a short part of a letter published in 1784, calculated that a star with the same density but 500 times the radius of the Sun would not let any emitted light escape; the surface escape velocity would exceed the speed of light. Michell correctly hypothesized that such non-radiating bodies might be detectable through their gravitational effects on nearby visible bodies. In 1796, while speculating on the origin of the Solar System in his book Exposition du Système du Monde, Laplace made a qualitative suggestion that a star could be invisible if it were sufficiently large. Franz Xaver von Zach asked Laplace for a mathematical analysis, which Laplace provided and published in von Zach's journal Allgemeine Geographische Ephemeriden.

=== General relativity ===
In 1905, Albert Einstein showed that the laws of electromagnetism are identical for observers travelling at different velocities relative to each other. The laws of mechanics had already been shown to be invariant in this way. However, the theory of gravitation was yet to be included.

In 1907, Einstein published a paper proposing his equivalence principle, the hypothesis that inertial mass and gravitational mass have a common cause. Using the principle, Einstein predicted the redshift and the lensing effect of gravity on light; his prediction of gravitational lensing was one-half of the value that the full theory of general relativity would predict. By 1915, Einstein refined these ideas into his general theory of relativity, which explained how matter affects spacetime, which in turn affects the motion of other matter. This formed the basis for black hole astrophysics.

=== Singular solutions in general relativity ===
Only a few months after Einstein published the field equations describing general relativity, astrophysicist Karl Schwarzschild set out to apply the idea to stars. He assumed spherical symmetry with no spin and found a solution to Einstein's equations. A few months after Schwarzschild, Johannes Droste, a student of Hendrik Lorentz, independently gave the same solution. At a certain radius from the centre of the mass, the Schwarzschild solution became singular, meaning that some of the terms in the Einstein equations became infinite. The nature of this radius, which later became known as the Schwarzschild radius, was not understood at the time.

Many physicists of the early 20th century were sceptical of the existence of black holes. In a 1926 popular science book, Arthur Eddington critiqued the idea of a star with mass compressed to its Schwarzschild radius as a flaw in the then-poorly-understood theory of general relativity. In 1939, Einstein used his theory of general relativity in an attempt to prove that black holes were impossible. His work relied on increasing pressure or increasing centrifugal force balancing the force of gravity so that the object would not collapse beyond its Schwarzschild radius. He missed the possibility that implosion would drive the system below this critical value.

=== Gravity vs. degeneracy pressure ===
By the 1920s, astronomers had classified a number of white dwarf stars as too cool and dense to be explained by the gradual cooling of ordinary stars. In 1926, Ralph Fowler showed that these stars are not like main-sequence stars, where thermal pressure balances gravity. Instead, a type of quantum-mechanical pressure balances gravity at these temperatures and densities. In 1931, Subrahmanyan Chandrasekhar studied the new state of matter that results from this balance, called electron-degenerate matter, discovering that it is stable below a certain limiting mass. By 1934 he showed that this explained the catalogue of white dwarf stars. When Chandrasekhar announced his results, Eddington pointed out that stars above this limit would radiate until they were sufficiently dense to prevent light from exiting, a conclusion he considered absurd. Eddington and, later, Lev Landau argued that some yet unknown mechanism would stop the collapse.

In the 1930s, Fritz Zwicky and Walter Baade studied stellar novae, focusing on exceptionally bright ones they called supernovae. Zwicky promoted the idea that supernovae produced stars with the density of atomic nuclei—neutron stars—but this idea was largely ignored at the time. In 1939, based on Chandrasekhar's reasoning, but working within general relativity rather than Newtonian gravity, J. Robert Oppenheimer and George Volkoff predicted that neutron stars below a certain mass limit, later called the Tolman–Oppenheimer–Volkoff limit, would be stable due to neutron degeneracy pressure. Above that limit, they reasoned that either their model would not apply or that gravitational contraction would not stop.

John Archibald Wheeler and two of his students resolved questions about the model behind the Tolman–Oppenheimer–Volkoff (TOV) limit. In 1965, Harrison and Wheeler developed the equations of state relating density to pressure for cold matter all the way through electron degeneracy and neutron degeneracy. Masami Wakano and Wheeler then used the equations to compute the equilibrium curve for stars, relating mass to circumference. They found no additional features that would invalidate the TOV limit. This meant that the only thing that could prevent black holes from forming was a dynamic process ejecting sufficient mass from a star as it cooled.

=== Birth of modern model ===
The modern concept of black holes was formulated by Robert Oppenheimer and his student Hartland Snyder in 1939. In the paper, Oppenheimer and Snyder solved Einstein's equations of general relativity for an idealised imploding star, in a model later called the Oppenheimer–Snyder model, then described the results from far outside the star. The implosion starts as one might expect: the star material rapidly collapses inward. However, as the density of the star increases, gravitational time dilation increases and the collapse, viewed from afar, seems to slow down further and further until the star reaches its Schwarzschild radius, where it appears frozen in time.

In 1958, David Finkelstein identified the Schwarzschild surface as an event horizon, calling it "a perfect unidirectional membrane: causal influences can cross it in only one direction". This means that events that occur inside the black hole cannot affect events that occur outside the black hole. Finkelstein created a new reference frame to include the point of view of infalling observers. Finkelstein's new frame of reference allowed events at the surface of an imploding star to be related to events far away. By 1962 the two points of view were reconciled, convincing many sceptics that implosion into a black hole made physical sense.

=== Golden age ===
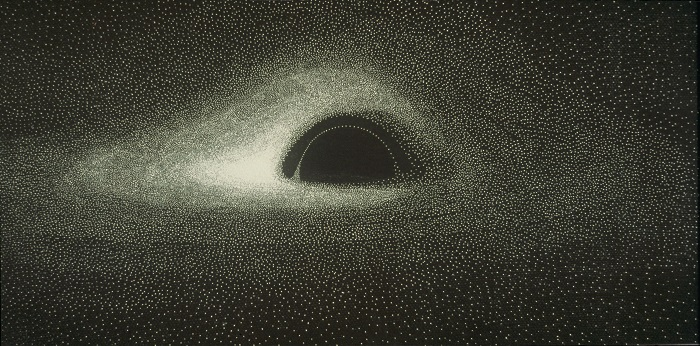
The first simulated image of a black hole, published by Jean-Pierre Luminet in 1979 and featuring the characteristic shadow, photon sphere, and lensed accretion disk. The disk is brighter on one side due to Doppler beaming.

The era from the mid-1960s to the mid-1970s was the "golden age of black hole research", when general relativity and black holes became mainstream subjects of research.

In this period, solutions to the equations of general relativity under various different physical constraints were discovered. In 1963, Roy Kerr found the exact solution for a rotating black hole. Two years later, Ezra Newman found the axisymmetric solution for a black hole that is both rotating and electrically charged.

In the late 1960s and early 1970s, scientists from research groups formed by Yakov Zeldovich, John Archibald Wheeler and Dennis W. Sciama discovered a series of important mathematical properties of black hole models dubbed "a black hole has no hair" by Wheeler. The first hints came from work by Vitaly Ginzburg who studied a series of increasing compact stars threaded with intense magnetic fields. He discovered that the fields get trapped on the black hole surface. In 1967, Werner Israel showed that any non-spinning, uncharged collapsing star gives a spherically symmetric black hole: any asymmetry must somehow vanish. In 1972, Richard H. Price found that the asymmetry was converted into gravitational waves. It took another 15 years and many physicists to produce a body of work that became known as the no-hair theorem, which states that a stationary black hole is completely described by the three parameters of the Kerr–Newman metric: mass, angular momentum, and electric charge.

At first, it was suspected that the strange mathematical singularities found in each of the black hole solutions only appeared due to the assumption that a black hole would be perfectly spherically symmetric, and therefore the singularities would not appear in generic situations where black holes would not necessarily be symmetric. This view was held in particular by Vladimir Belinski, Isaak Khalatnikov, and Evgeny Lifshitz, who tried to prove that no singularities appear in generic solutions, although they would later reverse their positions. However, in 1965, Roger Penrose proved that general relativity predicts that singularities appear in all black holes, although this may not still hold when quantum mechanics is taken into account.

Astronomical observations also made great strides during this era. In 1967, Antony Hewish and Jocelyn Bell Burnell discovered pulsars, and by 1969 these were shown to be rapidly rotating neutron stars. Until that time, neutron stars, like black holes, were regarded as just theoretical curiosities, but the discovery of pulsars showed their physical relevance and spurred a further interest in all types of compact objects that might be formed by gravitational collapse. However, experimental evidence confirming a black hole was very difficult to obtain and ultimately required efforts from many astronomers. X-ray telescope observations by Riccardo Giacconi's team in 1971 showed that Cygnus X-1 emitted x-rays in rapid, sporadic fashion consistent with a compact source. This became the first candidate black hole. Optical spectroscopy and detailed astrophysical models for Cygnus X-1 were consistent with a binary system of a massive star and compact star generating x-rays as gas from the massive but ordinary star was sucked into its invisible compact companion. (In 2011, the masses of these stars was estimated to be 14.1±1.0 M_{☉} for the black hole and 19.2±1.9 M_{☉} for the optical stellar companion.) By 1974 the object was widely considered to be a black hole, but 100% confidence for Cygnus X-1 may not be possible.

Work by James Bardeen, Brandon Carter, and Stephen Hawking in the early 1970s led to the formulation of black hole thermodynamics. These laws describe the behaviour of a black hole in a manner analogous to the laws of thermodynamics. Jacob Bekenstein strengthened this analogy with the properties of mass, surface area, and surface gravity for a black hole related to the thermodynamical concepts of energy, entropy, and temperature respectively. The analogy was completed when Hawking, in 1974, showed that quantum field theory implies that black holes should radiate like a black body with a temperature proportional to the surface gravity of the black hole, predicting the effect now known as Hawking radiation.

=== Modern research and observation ===
The first detection of gravitational waves, imaged by LIGO observatories in Hanford Site, Washington and Livingston, Louisiana

While Cygnus X-1, a stellar-mass black hole, was generally accepted by the scientific community as a black hole by the end of 1973, it would be decades before a supermassive black hole would gain the same broad recognition. The idea that such objects might exist began with models suggesting that powerful quasars or active galactic nuclei in the centre of galaxies were powered by accreting supermassive black holes. When the Hubble Space Telescope launched in the 1990s, optical studies of the centre of galaxy Messier 87 showed it must have a large concentration of mass. The two candidates for this mass were a black hole and a dense cluster of stars. In 1995, interferometric microwave spectra from the Very Long Baseline Array observed H_{2}O masers as they orbited the centre of NGC 4258, a galaxy with a similar central mass. The orbital parameters ruled out dense stellar clusters as an explanation for galactic nuclei, making supermassive black holes the only plausible explanation.

In 1999, David Merritt proposed the M–sigma relation, which related the dispersion of the velocity of matter in the centre bulge of a galaxy to the mass of the supermassive black hole at its core. Subsequent studies confirmed this correlation. Around the same time, based on telescope observations of the velocities of stars at the centre of the Milky Way galaxy, independent work groups led by Andrea Ghez and Reinhard Genzel concluded that the compact radio source in the centre of the galaxy, Sagittarius A*, was likely a supermassive black hole.

In late 2015, the LIGO Scientific Collaboration and Virgo Collaboration made the first direct detection of gravitational waves, named GW150914, representing the first observation of a black hole merger. At the time of the merger, the black holes were approximately 1.4 billion light-years away from Earth and had masses roughly 30 and 35 times that of the Sun. In 2017, Rainer Weiss, Kip Thorne, and Barry Barish, who had spearheaded the project, were awarded the Nobel Prize in Physics for their work. Since the initial discovery in 2015, hundreds more gravitational waves have been observed.

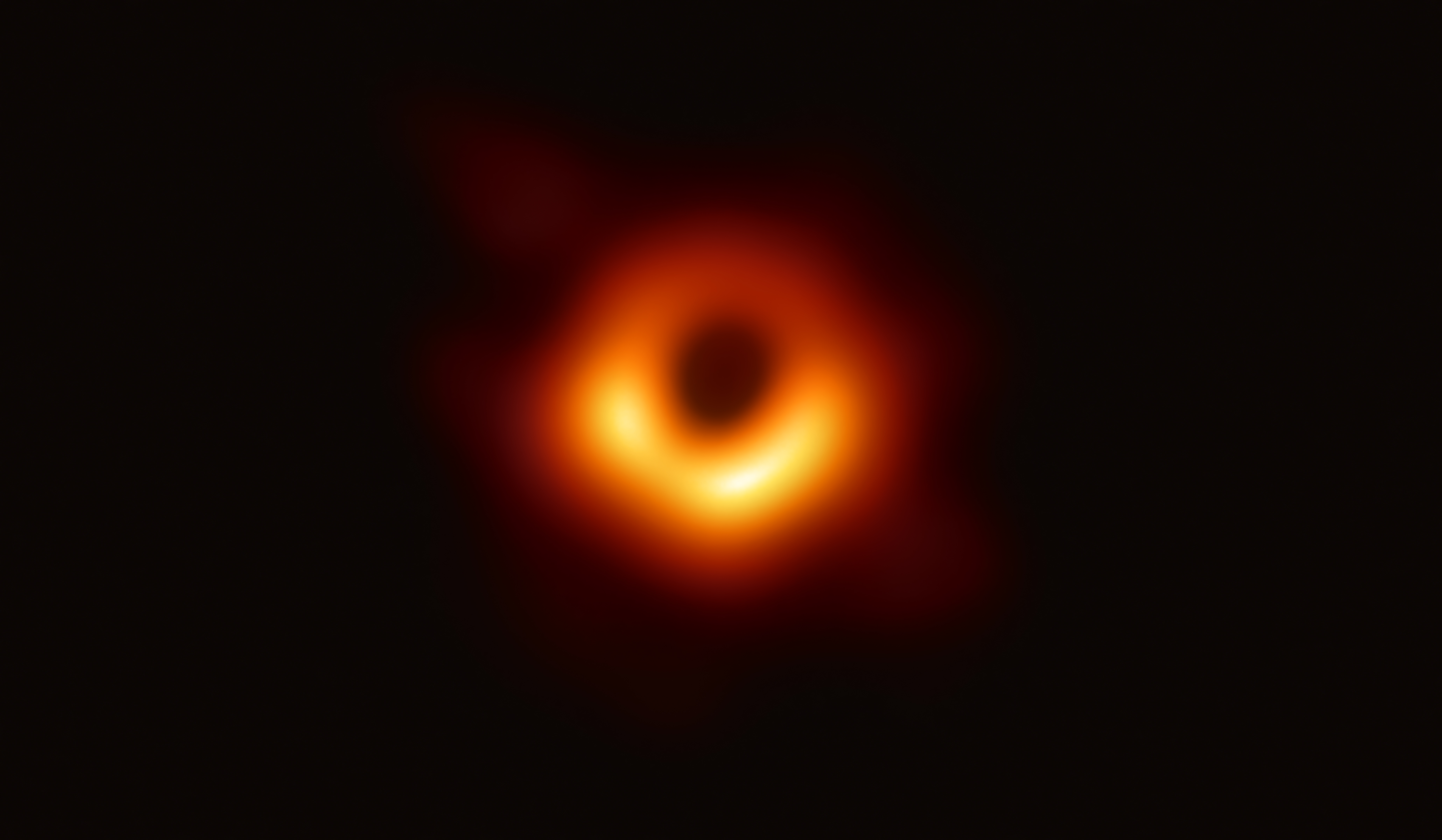
Image by the Event Horizon Telescope of the supermassive black hole in the centre of Messier 87

On 10 April 2019, the first direct image of a black hole and its vicinity was published, following observations made by the Event Horizon Telescope (EHT) of the supermassive black hole in Messier 87's galactic centre. In 2022, the Event Horizon Telescope collaboration released an image of the black hole in the center of the Milky Way galaxy, Sagittarius A*; the data had been collected in 2017.

In 2020, the Nobel Prize in Physics was awarded for work on black holes. Andrea Ghez and Reinhard Genzel shared one-half for their discovery that Sagittarius A* is a supermassive black hole. Penrose received the other half for his work showing that the mathematics of general relativity requires the formation of black holes. Cosmologists lamented that Hawking's extensive theoretical work on black holes would not be honoured, since he had died in 2018 and the Nobel Prize cannot be awarded posthumously.

=== Etymology ===
In December 1967, someone in the audience reportedly suggested the phrase black hole at a lecture by John Wheeler; Wheeler adopted the term for its brevity and "advertising value", and Wheeler's stature in the field ensured it quickly caught on, leading some to credit Wheeler with coining the phrase. However, the term was used by others around that time. Science writer Marcia Bartusiak traces the term black hole to physicist Robert H. Dicke, who in the early 1960s reportedly compared the phenomenon to the Black Hole of Calcutta, notorious as a prison where people entered but never left alive. The term was used in print by Life and Science News magazines in 1963, and by science journalist Ann Ewing in her article "'Black Holes' in Space", dated 18 January 1964, which was a report on a meeting of the American Association for the Advancement of Science held in Cleveland, Ohio.

== Definition ==
A black hole is generally defined as a region of spacetime from which no information-carrying signals or objects can escape. However, verifying an object as a black hole by this definition would require waiting for an infinite time and at an infinite distance from the black hole to verify that nothing has escaped, and thus cannot be used to identify a physical black hole. There are several other definitions that can be used to describe or identify black holes, leading to a variety of ways to study them. Astronomical observations measure the mass of objects, and gravitational collapse theories predict that a compact object with a mass larger than three solar masses can only be a black hole: this limit has become the observational definition. A black hole may also be defined as a reservoir of information or a region where space is falling inwards faster than the speed of light.

== Properties ==
The no-hair theorem establishes that, once it achieves a stable condition after formation, a black hole has only three independent physical properties: mass, electric charge, and angular momentum; the black hole is otherwise featureless. Any two black holes that share the same values for these properties, or parameters, are indistinguishable from one another. A related no-hair conjecture proposes that dynamic gravitational collapse always results in an object characterized with only these three properties. The conjecture is currently an unsolved problem. The no-hair theorem also makes idealized assumptions in addition to equilibrium that may not apply to astrophysical objects.

The simplest equilibrium black hole model with only mass but neither electric charge nor angular momentum is called a Schwarzschild black hole. Non-rotating charged black holes are described by the Reissner–Nordström metric, while the Kerr metric describes a non-charged rotating black hole. The most general stationary black hole solution known is the Kerr–Newman metric, which describes a black hole with both charge and angular momentum.

=== Mass ===
Radii for shadow and photon sphere relative to the event horizon

The simplest static black holes have mass but neither electric charge nor angular momentum. Contrary to the popular notion of a black hole "sucking in everything" in its surroundings, from far away, the external gravitational field of a black hole is identical to that of any other body of the same mass.

While a black hole can theoretically have any positive mass, its charge and angular momentum are limited by its mass, with this limit being greater for more massive black holes. The net electric charge $Q$ and the total angular momentum $J$ satisfy the inequality
$$\frac{Q^2}{4\pi\epsilon_0} + \frac{c^2 J^2}{G M^2} \le G M^2$$
for a black hole of mass $M$, where $\epsilon_0$ is the vacuum permittivity constant, $c$ is the speed of light and $G$ is the gravitational constant. Black holes with the maximum possible combination of charge and spin satisfying this inequality are called extremal black holes. Adding a low-mass object with a lot of charge or angular momentum to an extremal black hole would create a so-called naked singularity, a singularity outside of a black hole. Because these singularities make the universe inherently unpredictable, many physicists believe they could not exist. The weak cosmic censorship hypothesis, proposed by Penrose, rules out the formation of such singularities, when they are created through the gravitational collapse of realistic matter. This hypothesis remains an important area of study because it has not yet been proven and it relates to many aspects of general relativity and quantum gravity.

The total mass of a nearby black hole can be estimated by analysing the motion of the stars or gas surrounding it. The mass of distant supermassive black holes can be inferred from Doppler broadening of spectral lines emitted by rapidly orbiting gas, a technique called reverberation mapping.

=== Spin and angular momentum ===
All black holes spin, often rapidly. One stellar black hole, GRS 1915+105, has been estimated to spin at over 1,000 revolutions per second. The Milky Way's central black hole Sagittarius A* rotates at about 90% of the maximum possible rate.

The spin rate can be inferred from measurements of atomic spectral lines in the X-ray range. As gas near the black hole plunges inward, high energy X-ray emission from electron-positron pairs illuminates the gas further out, appearing red-shifted due to relativistic effects. Depending on the spin of the black hole, this plunge happens at different radii from the hole, with different degrees of redshift. Astronomers can use the gap between the x-ray emission of the outer disk and the redshifted emission from plunging material to determine the spin of the black hole.

A newer way to estimate spin is based on the temperature of gases accreting onto the black hole. The method requires an independent measurement of the black hole mass and inclination angle of the accretion disk followed by computer modelling. Gravitational waves from coalescing binary black holes can also provide the spin of both progenitor black holes and the merged hole, but such events are rare.

A spinning black hole has angular momentum. The Kerr metric is the solution of Einstein's field equations for a rotating black hole. In addition to the Schwarzschild radius, $r_\text{s}$, it includes a rotational parameter,
$$a = \frac{J}{M} = \frac{2J}{r_\text{s}},$$
where $J$ is the black hole angular momentum. An extremal black hole has $|J|= M^2$, corresponding to $a=1$. The supermassive black hole in the centre of the Messier 87 (M87) galaxy appears to have a rotational parameter of 0.90±0.05, very close to the maximum theoretical value.

=== Charge ===
Black holes are believed to have an approximately neutral charge. For example, Michal Zajaček, Arman Tursunov, Andreas Eckart, and Silke Britzen found the electric charge of Sagittarius A* to be at least ten orders of magnitude below the theoretical maximum. If a black hole were to become charged, particles with an opposite sign of charge would be pulled in by the extra electromagnetic force, while particles with the same sign of charge would be repelled, neutralising the black hole. This effect operates even more rapidly if the black hole is also spinning. A spinning black hole in a magnetic field creates an electric field which would interact with charged particles. Since black holes have so few measurable intrinsic properties, techniques for measuring charge are of interest to astrophysics even if the values may be very small.

The charge Q for a nonspinning black hole is bounded by
$$Q\leq\sqrt{4\pi \epsilon_0 G}M,$$
where G is the gravitational constant and M is the black hole's mass.

== Classification ==
Black hole classifications
Class	Approx. mass	Approx. radius
Ultramassive black hole	10^{9}–10^{11} M_{☉}	>1,000 AU
Supermassive black hole	10^{6}–10^{9} M_{☉}	0.001–400 AU
Intermediate-mass black hole	10^{2}–10^{5} M_{☉}	10^{3} km ≈ R_{Earth}
Stellar black hole	2–150 M_{☉}	30 km
Micro black hole	up to M_{Moon}	up to 0.1 mm

Black holes are classified by the theory of their formation and by their mass (expressed in terms of M_{☉}, the mass of the Sun), but these criteria are intertwined. Stellar black holes are formed by stellar collapse. The minimum mass of a black hole formed by stellar gravitational collapse is governed by the maximum mass of a neutron star and is believed to be 2-4 M_{☉}. Hypothetical primordial black holes, believed to have formed soon after the Big Bang, could be far smaller, with masses as little as 10^{−5} grams at formation. These very small black holes are sometimes called micro black holes.

Stellar black holes can have a wide range of masses. Estimates of their maximum mass at formation vary, but generally range from 10-100 M_{☉}, with higher estimates for black holes progenated by low-metallicity stars. Stellar black holes can gain mass via accretion of nearby matter, often from a companion object such as a star or by merger with another black hole.

A small number of candidate black holes with masses in the range 10^{2}-10^{4} M_{☉} have been reported. These are larger than stellar black holes but smaller than supermassive black holes, are rarer than either extreme, and are called intermediate-mass black holes. Physicists have speculated that such black holes may form from collisions in globular and star clusters or at the centre of low-mass galaxies. They may also form as the result of mergers of smaller black holes, with several gravitational wave measurements consistent with merged black holes within 110–350 M_{☉}.

The black holes with the largest masses are called supermassive black holes, with masses more than 10^{6} M_{☉}. These black holes are believed to exist at the centres of almost every large galaxy, including the Milky Way. Some scientists have proposed a subcategory of even larger black holes, called ultramassive black holes, with masses greater than 10^{9}-10^{10} M_{☉}. Theoretical models predict that the accretion disc that feeds black holes will be unstable once a black hole reaches 50×10^{9}–100×10^{9} M_{☉}, setting a rough upper limit to black hole mass.

== Structure ==
While black holes are conceptually invisible sinks of all matter and light, in astronomical settings, their enormous gravity alters the motion of surrounding objects and pulls nearby gas inwards at near-light speed, making the area around black holes the brightest objects in the universe.

=== External geometry ===
==== Relativistic jets ====
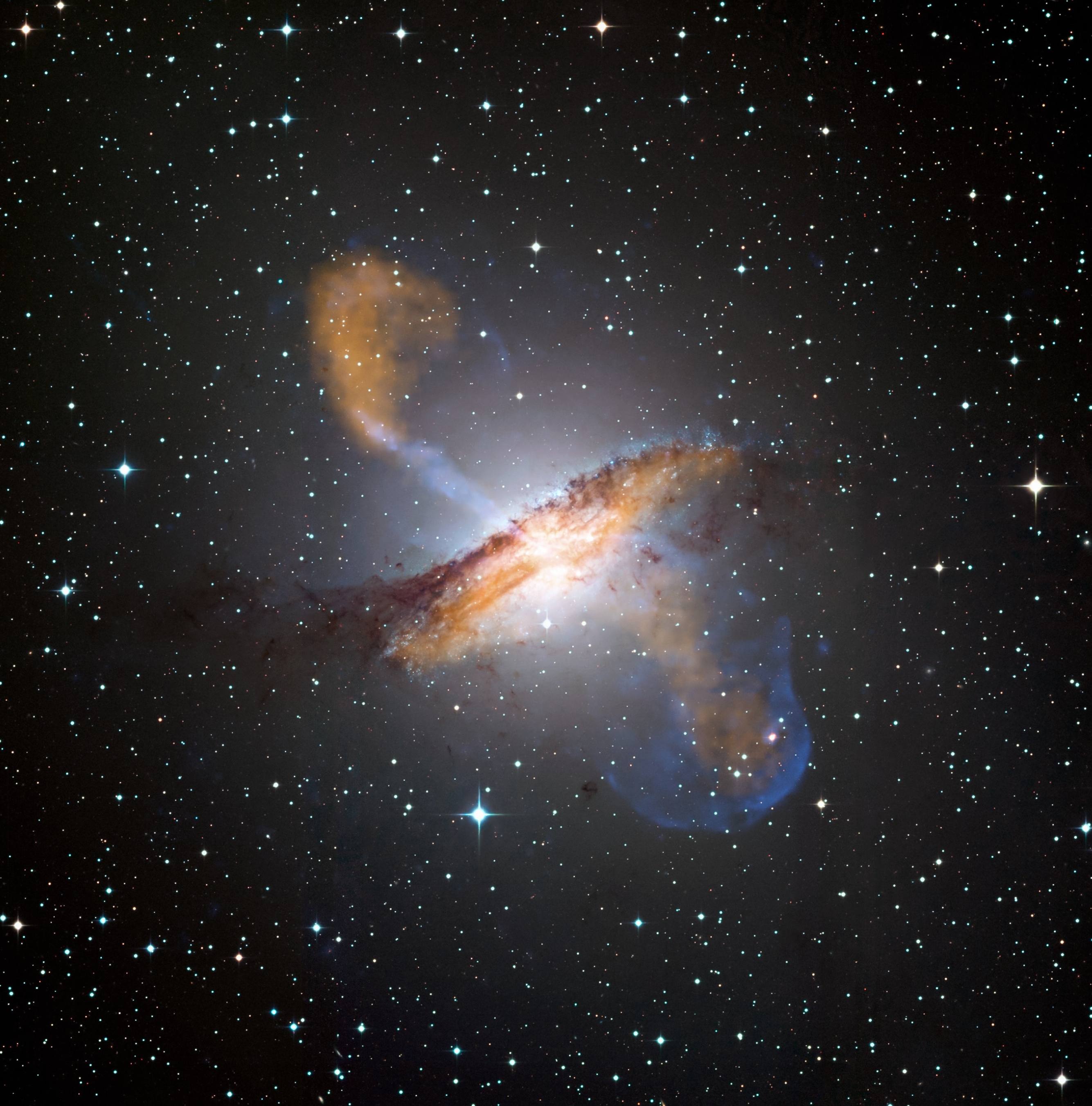
Relativistic jets from the supermassive black hole in Centaurus A extend perpendicularly from the galaxy.

Some black holes have relativistic jets—thin streams of plasma travelling away from the black hole at more than 90% of the speed of light. A small fraction of the matter falling towards the black hole gets accelerated away along the hole rotation axis. These jets can extend as far as millions of light-years from the black hole itself.

Black holes of any mass can have jets. However, they are typically observed around spinning black holes with strongly-magnetized accretion disks. Relativistic jets were more common in the early universe, when galaxies and their corresponding supermassive black holes were rapidly gaining mass. All black holes with jets also have an accretion disk, but the jets are usually brighter than the disk. Quasars, typically found in other galaxies, are believed to be supermassive black holes with jets; microquasars are believed to be stellar-mass objects with jets, typically observed in the Milky Way.

The jets can be powered by either the accretion disk or the rotating black hole spin. While many details of the jets have been studied, no complete model has emerged. One method proposed to fuel these jets is the Blandford-Znajek process, which suggests that the dragging of magnetic field lines by a black hole's rotation could launch jets of matter into space. The Penrose process, which involves extraction of a black hole's rotational energy, has also been proposed as a potential mechanism of jet propulsion. There is evidence that jets at all scales, from microquasars to gamma ray bursts may be produced by a single mechanism.

==== Accretion disk ====
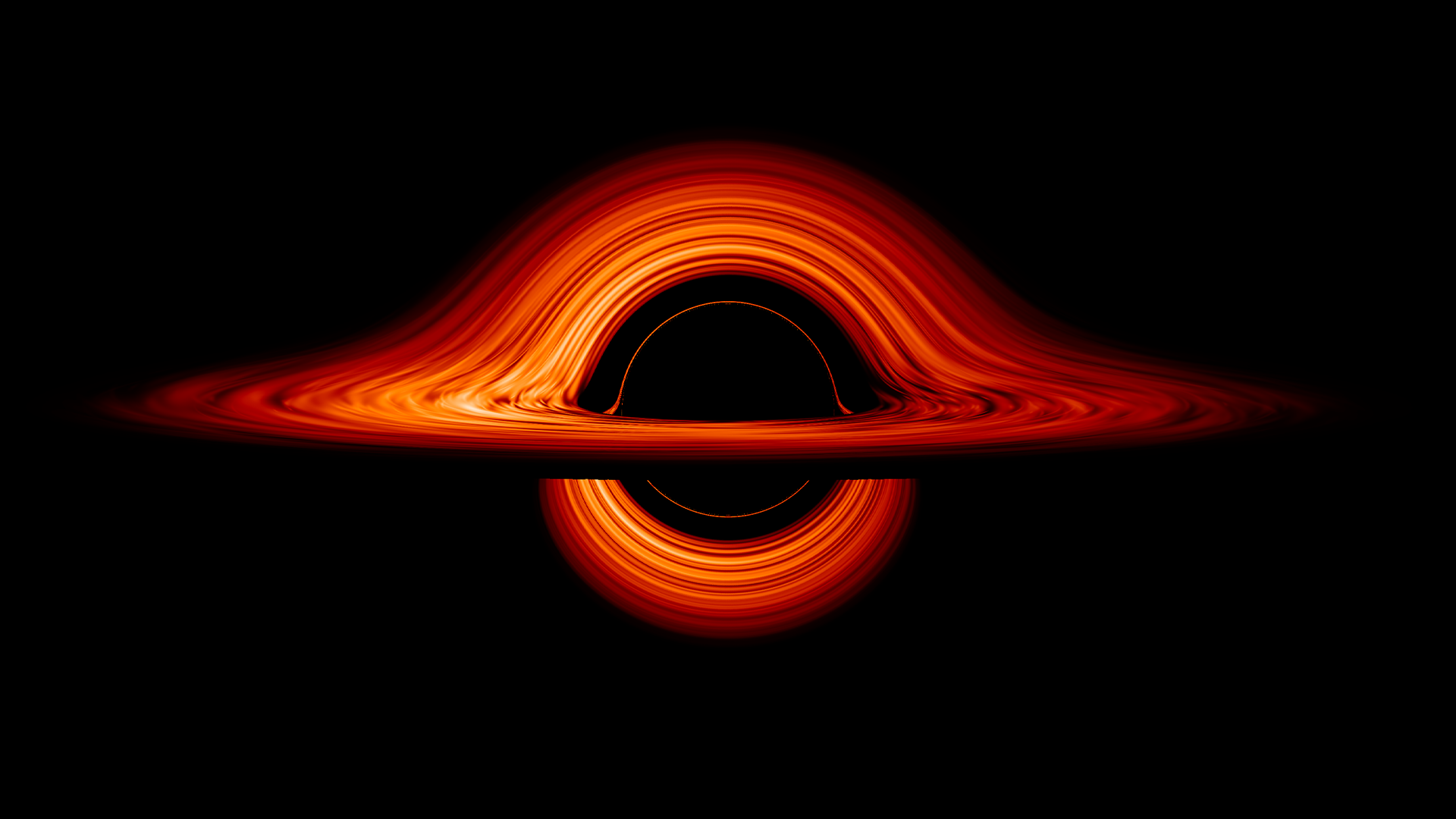
Visualization of a black hole with an orange accretion disk. The parts of the disk circling over and under the hole are actually gravitationally lensed from the back side of the black hole.

Due to conservation of angular momentum, gas falling into the gravitational well created by a massive object will typically form a disk-like structure around the object. As the disk's angular momentum is transferred outward due to processes such as turbulence in the disk, its matter falls farther inward, converting its gravitational energy into heat and releasing a large amount of radiation; absent an explosive event, the radiation pressure limits the accretion rate. The temperature of these disks can range from thousands to millions of kelvins, and temperatures differ throughout a single accretion disk. Accretion disks radiate across the entire electromagnetic spectrum, depending on the disk's turbulence and magnetisation and the black hole's mass and angular momentum.

Accretion disks can be defined as geometrically thin or geometrically thick. Geometrically thin disks are mostly confined to the black hole's equatorial plane and have a well-defined edge at the innermost stable circular orbit (ISCO), while geometrically thick disks are supported by internal pressure and temperature and can extend inside the ISCO. Disks with high rates of electron scattering and absorption, appearing bright and opaque, are called optically thick; optically thin disks are more translucent and produce fainter images when viewed from afar. Accretion disks of black holes accreting beyond the Eddington limit are often referred to as polish donuts due to their thick, toroidal shape that resembles that of a donut.

Quasar accretion disks are expected to have a "blue spectral shape", meaning that the flux per frequency $F_\nu$ is proportional to $\nu^{1/3}$; this was not originally observed due to emission from dust surrounding the objects. The disk for a stellar black hole, on the other hand, would likely look orange, yellow, or red, with its inner regions being the brightest. Accretion disk colours may also be altered by the Doppler effect, with the part of the disk travelling towards an observer appearing bluer and brighter and the part of the disk travelling away from the observer appearing redder and dimmer.

==== Innermost stable circular orbit (ISCO) ====
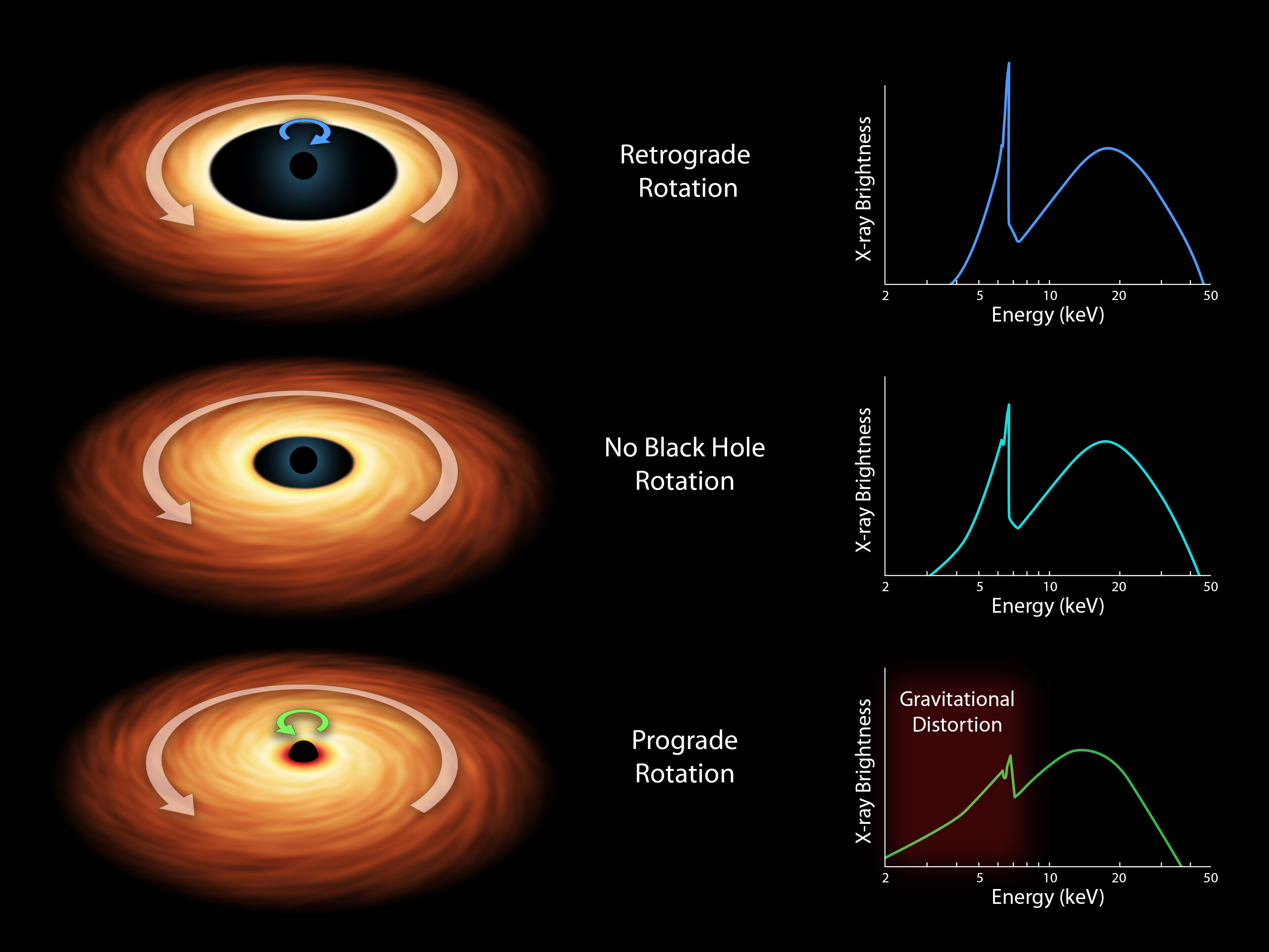
Since particles in a black hole's accretion disk must orbit at or outside the ISCO, astronomers can observe the properties of accretion disks to determine black hole spins.

In Newtonian gravity, test particles can stably orbit at arbitrary distances from a central object. In general relativity, however, there exists a smallest possible radius for which a massive particle can orbit stably. Any infinitesimal inward perturbations to this orbit will lead to the particle spiralling into the black hole, and any outward perturbations will, depending on the energy, cause the particle to spiral in, move to a stable orbit further from the black hole, or escape to infinity. This orbit is called the innermost stable circular orbit, or ISCO. In the case of a Schwarzschild black hole (spin zero) and a particle without spin, the location of the ISCO is:
$$r_{\rm ISCO}=3 \, r_\text{s}=\frac{6 \, GM}{c^2},$$
where $r_{\rm_{ISCO}}$ is the radius of the ISCO, $r_\text{s}$ is the Schwarzschild radius of the black hole, $G$ is the gravitational constant, and $c$ is the speed of light. For spinning black holes, the ISCO is moved inwards for particles orbiting in the same direction that the black hole is spinning (prograde) and outwards for particles orbiting in the opposite direction (retrograde). For example, the ISCO for a particle orbiting retrograde can be as far out as about $4.5r_\text{s}$, while the ISCO for a particle orbiting prograde can be as close as at the event horizon itself. The radius of this orbit changes slightly based on particle spin. For charged black holes, the ISCO moves inwards.

==== Photon sphere and shadow ====
Video of a photon being captured by a Schwarzschild black hole

The photon sphere is a spherical boundary for which photons moving on tangents to that sphere are bent completely around the black hole, possibly orbiting multiple times. For Schwarzschild black holes, the photon sphere has a radius 1.5 times the Schwarzschild radius.

Although light can still escape from the photon sphere, any light that crosses it on an inward trajectory is inevitably captured by the black hole. Consequently, any light reaching a distant observer from the photon sphere must have been emitted by objects located between the photon sphere and the event horizon. Light emitted towards the photon sphere may also curve around the black hole and return to the emitter.

For a rotating, uncharged black hole, the radius of the photon sphere depends on the spin parameter and whether the photon is orbiting prograde or retrograde. For a photon orbiting prograde, the photon sphere will be 0.5–1.5 Schwarzschild radii from the centre of the black hole, while for a photon orbiting retrograde, the photon sphere will be between 3–4 Schwarzschild radii from the centre of the black hole. The exact locations of the photon spheres depend on the magnitude of the black hole's rotation. For a charged, nonrotating black hole, there will only be one photon sphere, and the radius of the photon sphere will decrease for increasing black hole charge. For non-extremal, charged, rotating black holes, there will always be two photon spheres, with the exact radii depending on the parameters of the black hole.

When viewed from a great distance, the photon sphere creates an observable black hole shadow, a dark silhouette of the black hole against the background stars. Images such as those taken by the Event Horizon Telescope show the black hole shadow, not the event horizon itself. Since no light emerges from within the black hole, this shadow is the limit for possible observations. The shadow of colliding black holes should have characteristic warped shapes, allowing scientists to detect black holes that are about to merge.

==== Ergosphere ====
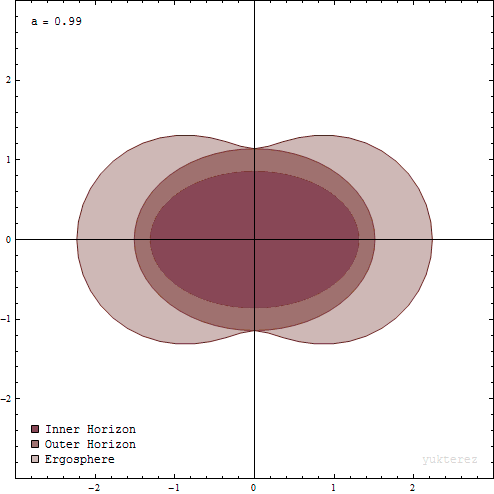
The ergosphere is a region outside of the event horizon, where objects cannot remain in place.

Near a rotating black hole, spacetime rotates similar to a vortex. The rotating spacetime will drag any matter and light into rotation around the spinning black hole. This effect of general relativity, called frame dragging, gets stronger closer to the spinning mass. The region of spacetime in which it is impossible to stay still is called the ergosphere.

The ergosphere of a black hole is the region of space bounded by the event horizon and the ergosurface, also known as the stationary limit surface. The ergosurface coincides with the event horizon at the poles but bulges outward around the equator.

Matter and radiation can escape from the ergosphere. Through the Penrose process, objects can emerge from the ergosphere with more energy than they entered with. The extra energy is taken from the rotational energy of the black hole, slowing down the rotation of the black hole.

==== Plunging region ====
The observable region of spacetime surrounding a black hole closest to its event horizon is known as the plunging region. Within this region, free-falling matter can no longer maintain stable circular orbits or halt its final descent into the black hole. Instead, it rapidly plunges inward at speeds approaching the speed of light, becoming increasingly hot and producing a distinctive, detectable thermal emission. However, light and radiation emitted from this region can still escape from the black hole's gravitational pull.

=== Radius ===
For a nonspinning, uncharged black hole, the radius of the event horizon, or Schwarzschild radius, is proportional to the mass, M, through
$$r_\text{s}=\frac{2GM}{c^2} \approx 2.95\, \frac{M}{M_\odot}~\mathrm{km,}$$
where r_{s} is the Schwarzschild radius, G is the gravitational constant, c is the speed of light, and M_{☉} is the mass of the Sun. A black hole of the same mass with nonzero spin has two radii:
$$r_{\pm} = M \pm \sqrt{M^2 - {{(J/M)}}^2}.$$
Most observed black holes have close to maximum angular momentum that seems to be allowed: $|J| \le M^2.$ For such black holes the radii will approach
$$r_\mathrm{+}=\frac{GM}{c^2}.$$
Since the volume within the Schwarzschild radius increases with the cube of the radius, average density of a black hole inside its Schwarzschild radius is inversely proportional to the square of its mass: supermassive black holes are much less dense than stellar black holes. The average density of a 10^{8} M_{☉} black hole is comparable to that of water.

=== Event horizon ===
Far away from the black hole, a particle can move in any direction, as illustrated by the set of arrows. It is restricted only by the speed of light.

Closer to the black hole, spacetime starts to deform. There are more paths going towards the black hole than paths moving away.

Inside of the event horizon, all paths bring the particle closer to the centre of the black hole. It is no longer possible for the particle to escape. (The diagram is a "cartoon" version of an Eddington–Finkelstein coordinates diagram; in other coordinates the light cones are not tilted in this way.)

The defining feature of a black hole is the existence of an event horizon, a boundary in spacetime through which matter and light can pass only inward towards the centre of the black hole. Nothing, not even light, can escape from inside the event horizon. The event horizon is referred to as such because if an event occurs within the boundary, information from that event cannot reach or affect an outside observer, making it impossible to determine whether such an event occurred. For non-rotating black holes, the geometry of the event horizon is precisely spherical, while for rotating black holes, the event horizon is oblate.

To a distant observer, a clock near a black hole would appear to tick more slowly than one further from the black hole. This effect, known as gravitational time dilation, would also cause an object falling into a black hole to appear to slow as it approached the event horizon, never quite reaching the horizon from the perspective of an outside observer. All processes on this object would appear to slow down, and any light emitted by the object to appear redder and dimmer, an effect known as gravitational redshift. An object falling from half of a Schwarzschild radius above the event horizon would fade away until it could no longer be seen, disappearing from view within one hundredth of a second for an 8 M_{☉} black hole. It would also appear to flatten onto the black hole, joining all other material that had ever fallen into the hole.

On the other hand, an observer falling into a black hole would not notice any of these effects as they cross the event horizon. Their own clocks appear to them to tick normally, and they cross the event horizon after a finite time without noting any singular behaviour. In general relativity, it is impossible to determine the location of the event horizon from local observations, due to Einstein's equivalence principle.

=== Internal geometry ===
==== Cauchy horizon ====
Black holes that are rotating or charged have an inner horizon, often called the Cauchy horizon, inside of the black hole. The inner horizon is divided up into two segments: an ingoing section and an outgoing section.

At the ingoing section of the Cauchy horizon, radiation and matter that fall into the black hole would build up at the horizon, causing the curvature of spacetime to go to infinity. This would cause an observer falling in to experience tidal forces. This phenomenon is often called mass inflation, since it is associated with a parameter dictating the black hole's internal mass growing exponentially, and the buildup of tidal forces is called the mass-inflation singularity or Cauchy horizon singularity. Some physicists have argued that in realistic black holes, accretion and Hawking radiation would stop mass inflation from occurring.

At the outgoing section of the inner horizon, infalling radiation would backscatter off of the black hole's spacetime curvature and travel outward, building up at the outgoing Cauchy horizon. This would cause an infalling observer to experience a gravitational shock wave and tidal forces as the spacetime curvature at the horizon grew to infinity. This buildup of tidal forces is called the shock singularity.

In the Penrose-Hawking singularity theorem, both of these singularities are weak, meaning that an object crossing them would only be deformed a finite amount by tidal forces, even though the spacetime curvature would still be infinite at the singularity. This is as opposed to a strong singularity, where an object hitting the singularity would be stretched and squeezed by an infinite amount. They are also null singularities, meaning that a photon could travel parallel to them without ever being intercepted.

==== Singularity ====
Ignoring quantum effects, every black hole has a singularity inside, points where the curvature of spacetime becomes infinite, and geodesics terminate within a finite proper time. For a non-rotating black hole, this region takes the shape of a single point; for a rotating black hole it is smeared out to form a ring singularity that lies in the plane of rotation. In both cases, the singular region has zero volume. All of the mass of the black hole ends up in the singularity. Since the singularity has nonzero mass in an infinitely small space, it can be thought of as having infinite density.

An object approaching a gravitational singularity will experience chaotic oscillations of spacetime.

Observers falling into a Schwarzschild black hole (i.e., non-rotating and not charged) cannot avoid being carried into the singularity once they cross the event horizon. As they fall further into the black hole, they will be torn apart by the growing tidal forces in a process sometimes referred to as spaghettification or the noodle effect. Eventually, they will reach the singularity and be crushed into an infinitely small point. However, any perturbations, such as those caused by matter or radiation falling in, would cause space to oscillate chaotically near the singularity. Any matter falling in would experience intense tidal forces rapidly changing in direction, all while being compressed into an increasingly small volume.

Alternative forms of general relativity, including addition of some quantum effects, can lead to regular, or nonsingular, black holes without singularities. For example, the fuzzball model, based on string theory, states that black holes are actually made up of quantum microstates and need not have a singularity or an event horizon. The theory of loop quantum gravity proposes that the curvature and density at the centre of a black hole is large, but not infinite.

== Formation ==
Black holes are formed by gravitational collapse of massive stars, either by direct collapse or during a supernova explosion in a process called fallback. Black holes can result from the merger of two neutron stars or a neutron star and a black hole. Other more speculative mechanisms include primordial black holes created from density fluctuations in the early universe, the collapse of dark stars, a hypothetical object powered by annihilation of dark matter, or from hypothetical self-interacting dark matter.

=== Supernova ===
Gravitational collapse occurs when an object's internal pressure is insufficient to resist the object's own gravity. At the end of a star's life, it will run out of hydrogen to fuse, and will start fusing more and more massive elements, until it gets to iron. Since the fusion of elements heavier than iron would require more energy than it would release, nuclear fusion ceases. If the iron core of the star is too massive, the star will no longer be able to support itself and will undergo gravitational collapse.

The mass of a black hole formed via a supernova has a lower bound: if the progenitor star is too small, the collapse may be stopped by the degeneracy pressure of the star's constituents, allowing the condensation of matter into an exotic denser state. Degeneracy pressure occurs from the Pauli exclusion principle: particles will resist being in the same place as each other. Progenitor stars with masses less than about 8 M_{☉} will become white dwarfs, where the degeneracy pressure of electrons balances gravity. For more massive progenitor stars, the force of gravity overcomes electron degeneracy pressure and the star compresses until neutron degeneracy pressure resists gravity, forming a neutron star. If the star is even more massive, neutron degeneracy pressure will not be able to resist the force of gravity and the star will collapse into a black hole.

While most of the energy released during gravitational collapse is emitted very quickly, an outside observer does not actually see the end of this process. Even though the collapse takes a finite amount of time from the reference frame of infalling matter, a distant observer would see the infalling material slow and halt just above the event horizon, due to gravitational time dilation. Light from the collapsing material takes longer and longer to reach the observer, with the delay growing to infinity as the emitting material reaches the event horizon. Thus the external observer never sees the formation of the event horizon; instead, the collapsing material seems to become dimmer and increasingly red-shifted, eventually fading away.

=== Other mechanisms ===
Observations of quasars from less than a billion years after the Big Bang has led to investigations of other ways to form black holes. The accretion process to build supermassive black holes has a limiting rate of mass accumulation and a billion years is not enough time to reach quasar status. One suggestion is direct collapse of nearly pure hydrogen gas (low metalicity) clouds characteristic of the young universe, forming a supermassive star which collapses into a black hole. It has been suggested that seed black holes with typical masses of ~10^{5} M_{☉} could have formed in this way which then could grow to ~10^{9} M_{☉}. However, the very large amount of gas required for direct collapse is not typically stable against fragmentation which would form multiple stars. Thus another approach suggests massive star formation followed by collisions that seed massive black holes which ultimately merge to create a quasar.

A neutron star in a common envelope with a regular star can accrete sufficient material to collapse to a black hole or two neutron stars can merge. These avenues for the formation of black holes are considered relatively rare.

=== Primordial black holes and the Big Bang ===
In the early universe, fluctuations of spacetime may have formed areas that were denser than their surroundings. Rapid early expansion of the universe may have allowed these areas to collapse, forming primordial black holes. Various models predict the creation of primordial black holes ranging from a Planck mass (~2.2×10^{−8} kg) to hundreds of thousands of solar masses. Primordial black holes with masses less than 10^{12} kg would have evaporated by now due to Hawking radiation.

Despite the early universe being extremely dense, it did not re-collapse into a black hole during the Big Bang, since the universe was expanding rapidly and did not have the gravitational differential necessary for black hole formation. Models for the gravitational collapse of objects of relatively constant size, such as stars, do not necessarily apply in the same way to rapidly expanding space such as the Big Bang.

=== High-energy collisions ===
In principle, black holes could be formed in high-energy particle collisions that achieve sufficient density, although no such events have been detected. These hypothetical micro black holes, which could form from the collision of cosmic rays and Earth's atmosphere or in particle accelerators like the Large Hadron Collider, would not be able to aggregate additional mass. Instead, they would evaporate in about 10^{−25} seconds, posing no threat to the Earth.

== Evolution ==
After a black hole forms, it may change through phenomena such as mergers, accretion of matter, and evaporation via Hawking radiation.

=== Merger ===
Simulation of two black holes colliding

Black holes can merge with other objects such as stars or other black holes. This is thought to have been important, especially in the early growth of supermassive black holes, which could have formed from the aggregation of many smaller objects. The process has also been proposed as the origin of some intermediate-mass black holes. Mergers of supermassive black holes may take a long time: As a binary of supermassive black holes approach each other, most nearby stars are slingshotted away, leaving little for the black holes to gravitationally interact with that would allow them to get closer to each other. This phenomenon has been called the final parsec problem, as the distance at which this happens is usually around one parsec.

=== Accretion of matter ===
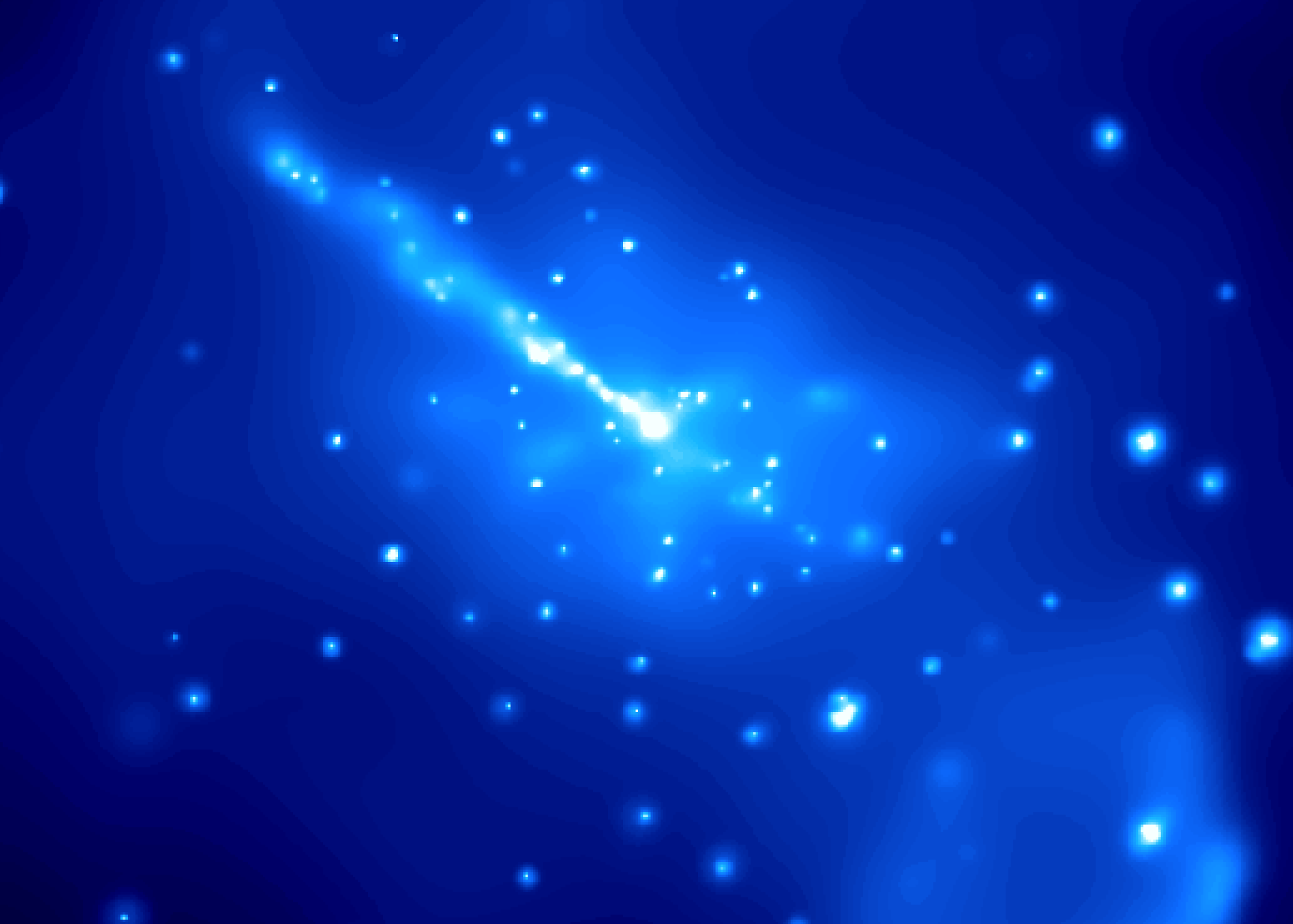
The active galactic nucleus of galaxy Centaurus A in X-ray light, believed to be powered by a supermassive black hole (centre) and surrounded by x-ray binaries (blue dots)

When a black hole accretes matter, the gas in the inner accretion disk orbits at very high speeds because of its proximity to the black hole. This fast-moving gas experiences friction against the slower-moving gas in the outer disk, transferring angular momentum to the outer disk. The loss of angular momentum forces the gas in the inner disk to orbit closer to the black hole, and its gravitational potential energy is converted into thermal energy. This heats the inner disk to temperatures at which it emits vast amounts of electromagnetic radiation (mainly X-rays), which is detectable by telescopes. By the time the matter of the disk reaches the ISCO, between 5.7% and 42% of its mass will have been converted to energy, depending on the black hole's spin. About 90% of this energy is released within 20 black hole radii. In many cases, accretion disks are accompanied by relativistic jets that are emitted along the black hole's poles, which carry away much of the energy.

Many of the universe's most energetic phenomena have been attributed to the accretion of matter on black holes. Active galactic nuclei and quasars are powered by accretion onto supermassive black holes. X-ray binaries are generally accepted to be binary systems in which one of the two objects is a compact object accreting matter from its companion. Ultraluminous X-ray sources may be the accretion disks of intermediate-mass black holes.

At a certain rate of accretion, the outward radiation pressure will become as strong as the inward gravitational force, and the black hole should, in theory, be unable to accrete any faster. This limit is called the Eddington limit. Realistically, many black holes accrete beyond this rate due to their non-spherical geometry or instabilities in the accretion disk. Accretion beyond the limit is called super-Eddington accretion and may have been commonplace in the early universe.

Stars have been observed to get torn apart by tidal forces in the immediate vicinity of supermassive black holes in galaxy nuclei, in what is known as a tidal disruption event (TDE). Some of the material from the disrupted star forms an accretion disk around the black hole, which emits observable electromagnetic radiation.

=== Interaction with galaxies ===
The correlation between the masses of supermassive black holes in the centres of galaxies with the velocity dispersion and mass of stars in their host bulges suggests that the formation of galaxies and the formation of their central black holes are related. Black hole winds from rapid accretion, particularly when the galaxy itself is still accreting matter, can compress gas nearby, accelerating star formation. However, if the winds become too strong, the black hole may blow nearly all of the gas out of the galaxy, quenching star formation. Black hole jets may also energise nearby cavities of plasma and eject low-entropy gas from out of the galactic core, causing gas in galactic centres to be hotter than expected.

=== Evaporation ===
If Hawking's theory of black hole radiation is correct, then black holes are expected to shrink and evaporate over time as they lose mass by the emission of photons and other particles. The temperature of this thermal spectrum (Hawking temperature) is proportional to the surface gravity of the black hole, which is inversely proportional to the mass. Hence, large black holes emit less radiation than small black holes. A stellar black hole of 1 M_{☉} has a Hawking temperature of 62 nanokelvins. This is far less than the 2.7 K temperature of the cosmic microwave background radiation. Stellar-mass or larger black holes receive more mass from the cosmic microwave background than they emit through Hawking radiation and thus will grow instead of shrinking. To have a Hawking temperature larger than 2.7 K (and be able to evaporate), a black hole would need a mass less than the Moon. Such a black hole would have a diameter of less than a tenth of a millimetre.

The Hawking radiation for an astrophysical black hole is predicted to be very weak and would thus be exceedingly difficult to detect from Earth. A possible exception is the microsecond-long burst of gamma rays emitted in the last stage of the evaporation of primordial black holes. Extensive searches for such radiation have proven unsuccessful and provide upper limits on the possibility of the existence of low mass primordial black holes.

=== Laws of mechanics and thermodynamics ===
A black hole's entropy scales with the surface area of its event horizon.

When based in general relativity, the constraints on a black hole's properties are called the laws of black hole mechanics. For a black hole that is not still forming or accreting matter, the zeroth law of black hole mechanics states the black hole's surface gravity is constant across the event horizon. The first law relates changes in the black hole's surface area, angular momentum, and charge to changes in its energy. The second law says the surface area of a black hole never decreases on its own. Finally, the third law says that the surface gravity of a black hole is never zero. These laws are mathematical analogues of the laws of thermodynamics. They are not equivalent, however, because, according to general relativity without quantum mechanics, a black hole can never emit radiation, and thus its temperature must always be zero.

Quantum mechanics predicts that a black hole will continuously emit thermal Hawking radiation, and therefore must always have a nonzero temperature. It also predicts that all black holes have entropy which scales with their surface area. When quantum mechanics is accounted for, the laws of black hole mechanics become equivalent to the classical laws of thermodynamics. However, these conclusions are derived without a complete theory of quantum gravity, although many potential theories do predict black holes having entropy and temperature. Thus, the true quantum nature of black hole thermodynamics continues to be debated.

== Observational evidence ==
Millions of black holes derived from stellar collapse are expected to exist in the Milky Way. Even a dwarf galaxy like Draco should have hundreds. Only a few of these have been detected. By nature, black holes do not themselves emit any electromagnetic radiation other than the hypothetical, typically extremely weak Hawking radiation, so astrophysicists searching for black holes must rely on indirect observations. The defining characteristic of a black hole is its event horizon. The horizon itself cannot be imaged, so all other possible explanations for these indirect observations must be considered and eliminated before concluding that a black hole has been observed.

=== Direct interferometry ===
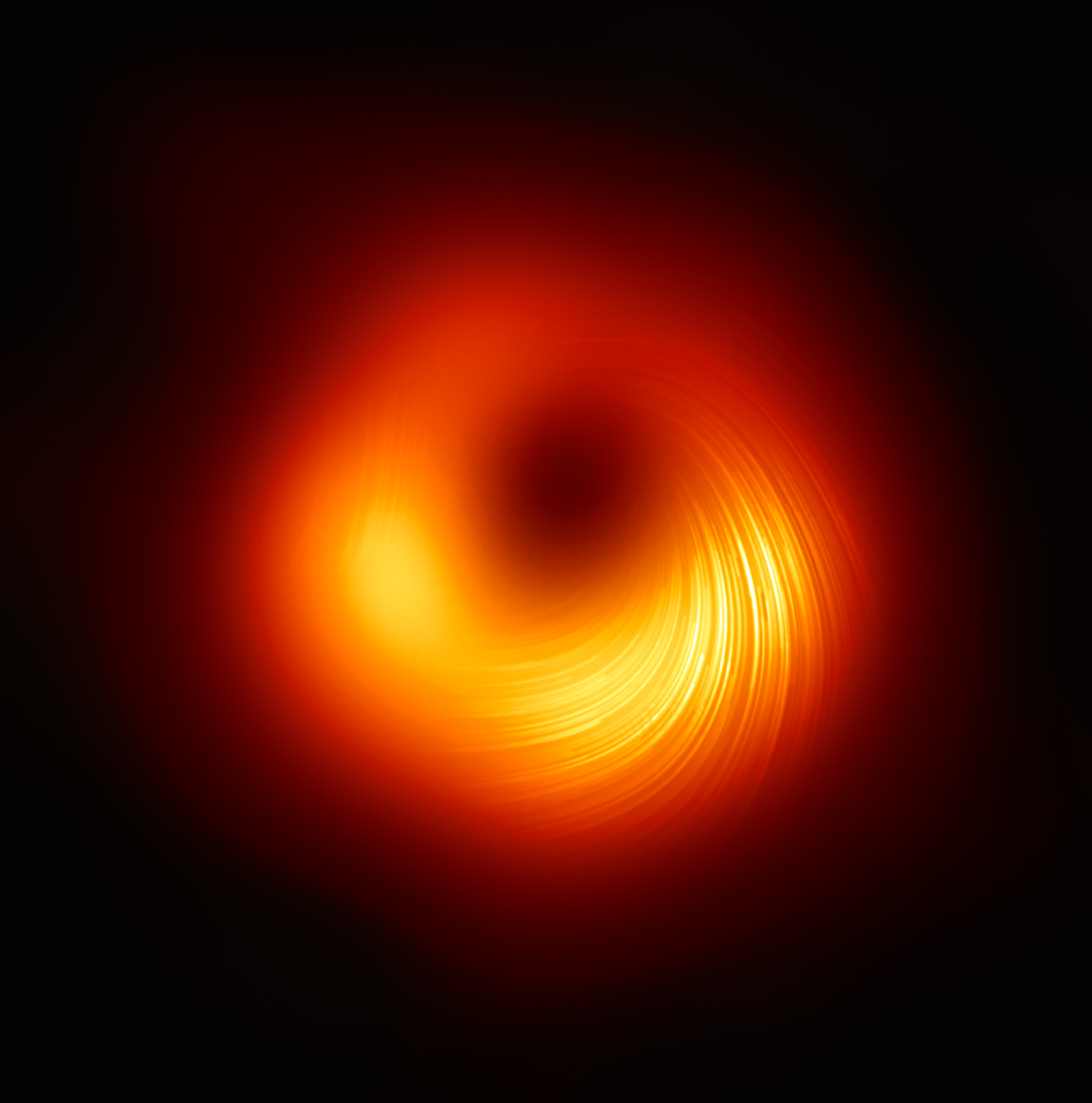
An M87* image with superimposed lines representing the magnitude and direction of polarisation

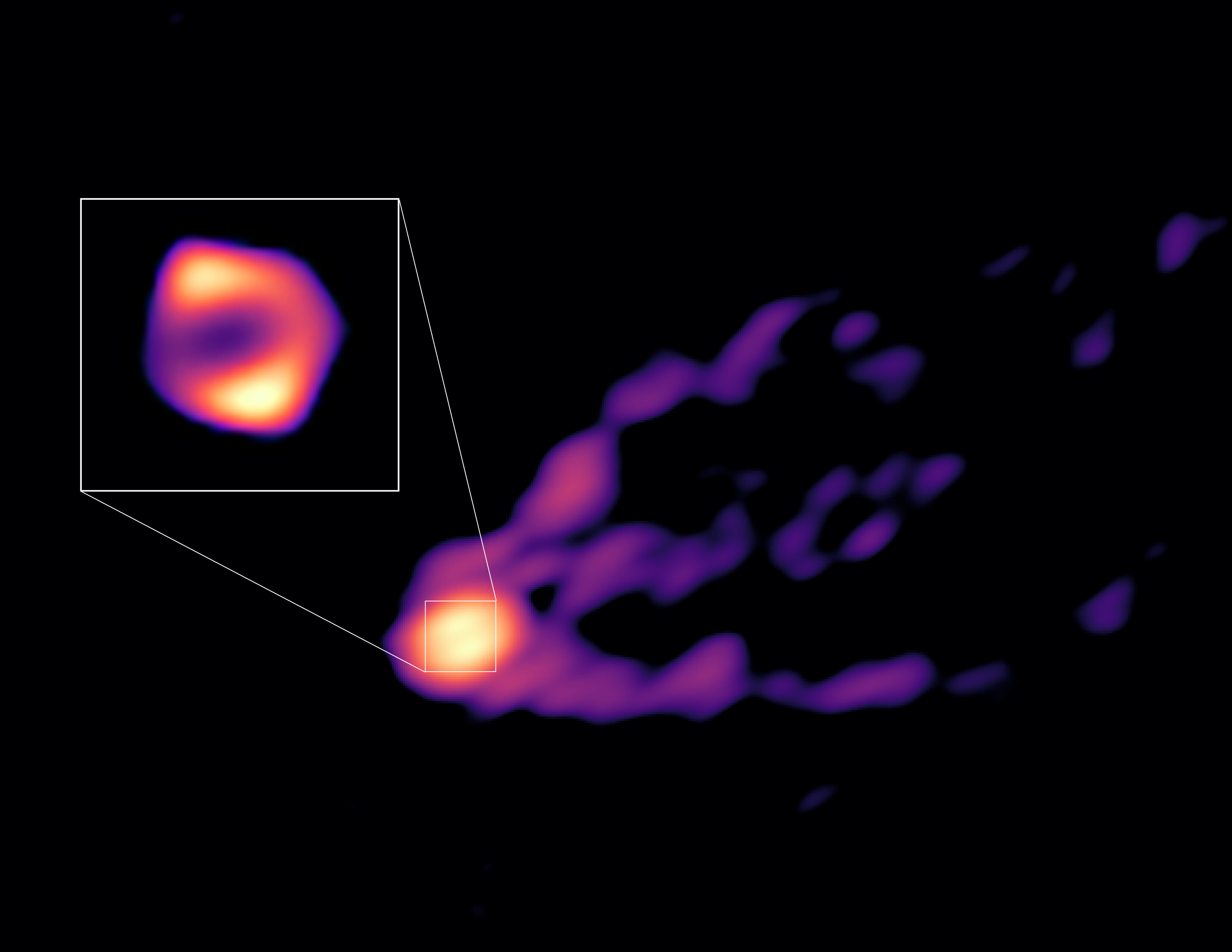
The M87* relativistic jet; inset is the black hole shadow

The Event Horizon Telescope (EHT) is a global system of radio telescopes capable of directly observing a black hole shadow. The angular resolution of a telescope is based on its aperture and the wavelengths it is observing. Because the angular diameters of Sagittarius A* and Messier 87* in the sky are very small, a single telescope would need to be about the size of the Earth to clearly distinguish their horizons using radio wavelengths. By combining data from several different radio telescopes around the world, the Event Horizon Telescope creates an effective aperture the diameter size of the Earth. The EHT team used imaging algorithms to compute the most probable image from the data in its observations of Sagittarius A* and M87*.

=== Gravitational waves ===
Gravitational-wave interferometry can be used to detect merging black holes and other compact objects. In this method, a laser beam is split, sent down two long arms of a tunnel, then reflected at the far end of the tunnels to reconverge at the intersection of the arms, precisely cancelling each other. However, when a gravitational wave passes, it warps spacetime, changing the relative lengths of the arms themselves. Since each laser beam is now travelling a slightly different distance, they do not cancel out and produce a recognisable signal. Analysis of the signal can give scientists information about what caused the gravitational waves. Since gravitational waves are very weak, gravitational-wave observatories such as LIGO must have arms several kilometres long and carefully control for noise from Earth to be able to detect these gravitational waves. Since the first measurements in 2016, multiple gravitational waves from black holes have been detected and analysed.

A satellite based gravitational wave instrument, LISA, is under construction with launch planned for approximately 2035. The mission will consist of three spacecraft flying in a triangular formation with 2.5 million km arm lengths to detect low-frequency gravitational waves from sources such as merging supermassive black holes and compact binary systems.

=== Stars orbiting Sagittarius A* ===
Stars moving around Sagittarius A*, as seen in 2021

The Event Horizon Telescope image of Sagittarius A*, the object at the centre of the Milky Way, released in 2022, provided confirmation that it is indeed a black hole.

The proper motions of stars near the centre of the Milky Way provide strong observational evidence that these stars are orbiting a supermassive black hole. Astronomers have tracked the motions of over 100 stars orbiting an invisible object coincident with the radio source Sagittarius A*. One of the stars—called S2—completed a full orbit. By fitting the motions of stars to Keplerian orbits, the astronomers were able to infer that the invisible object assumed to be Sagittarius A* must have a mass of 4.3×10^{6} M_{☉}, with a radius of less than 0.002 light-years. This upper limit radius is larger than the Schwarzschild radius for the estimated mass, so the combination does not prove Sagittarius A* is a black hole. Nevertheless, these observations strongly suggest that the central object is a supermassive black hole as there are no other plausible scenarios for confining so much invisible mass into such a small volume. Additionally, luminosity data from this object implies it must possess an event horizon, a defining feature of black holes. By tracking the motion of the centre it has been shown that the central object is motionless at the centre of the galaxy.

=== Binaries ===
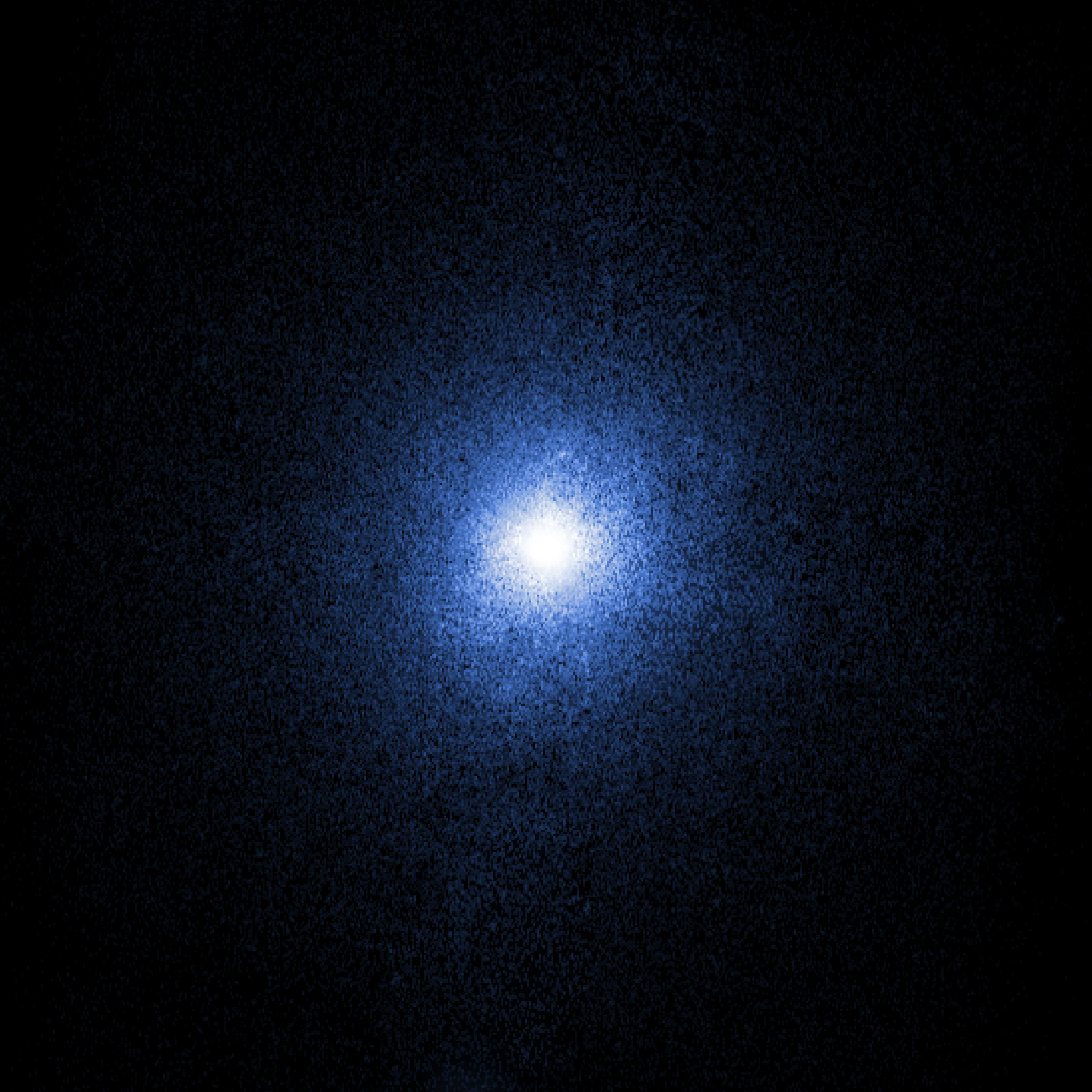
A Chandra X-Ray Observatory image of Cygnus X-1, which was the first strong black hole candidate discovered

X-ray binaries are binary systems that emit significant amounts of X-ray radiation. These X-ray emissions result when a compact object accretes matter from an ordinary star. The presence of an ordinary star in such a system provides an opportunity for studying the central object and to determine if it might be a black hole. By measuring the orbital period of the binary, the distance to the binary from Earth, and the mass of the companion star, scientists can estimate the mass of the compact object. The Tolman-Oppenheimer-Volkoff limit (TOV limit) dictates the largest mass a nonrotating neutron star can be, and is estimated to be about two solar masses. While a rotating neutron star can be slightly more massive, if the compact object is much more massive than the TOV limit, it cannot be a neutron star and is generally expected to be a black hole.

X-ray binaries can be categorised as either low-mass or high-mass; this classification is based on the mass of the companion star, not the compact object itself. In a class of X-ray binaries called soft X-ray transients, the companion star is of relatively low mass, allowing for more accurate estimates of the black hole mass. These systems actively emit X-rays for only several months once every 10–50 years. During the period of low X-ray emission, called quiescence, the accretion disk is extremely faint, allowing detailed observation of the companion star. Numerous black hole candidates have been measured by this method. Black holes are also sometimes found in binaries with other compact objects, such as white dwarfs, neutron stars, and other black holes.

=== Galactic nuclei ===
The centre of nearly every large galaxy contains a supermassive black hole. The close observational correlation between the mass of this hole and the velocity dispersion of the host galaxy's bulge, known as the M–sigma relation, strongly suggests a connection between the formation of the black hole and that of the galaxy itself. In some galaxies, the black hole forms a powerful source of radiation called an active galactic nucleus.

==== Active galactic nucleus ====
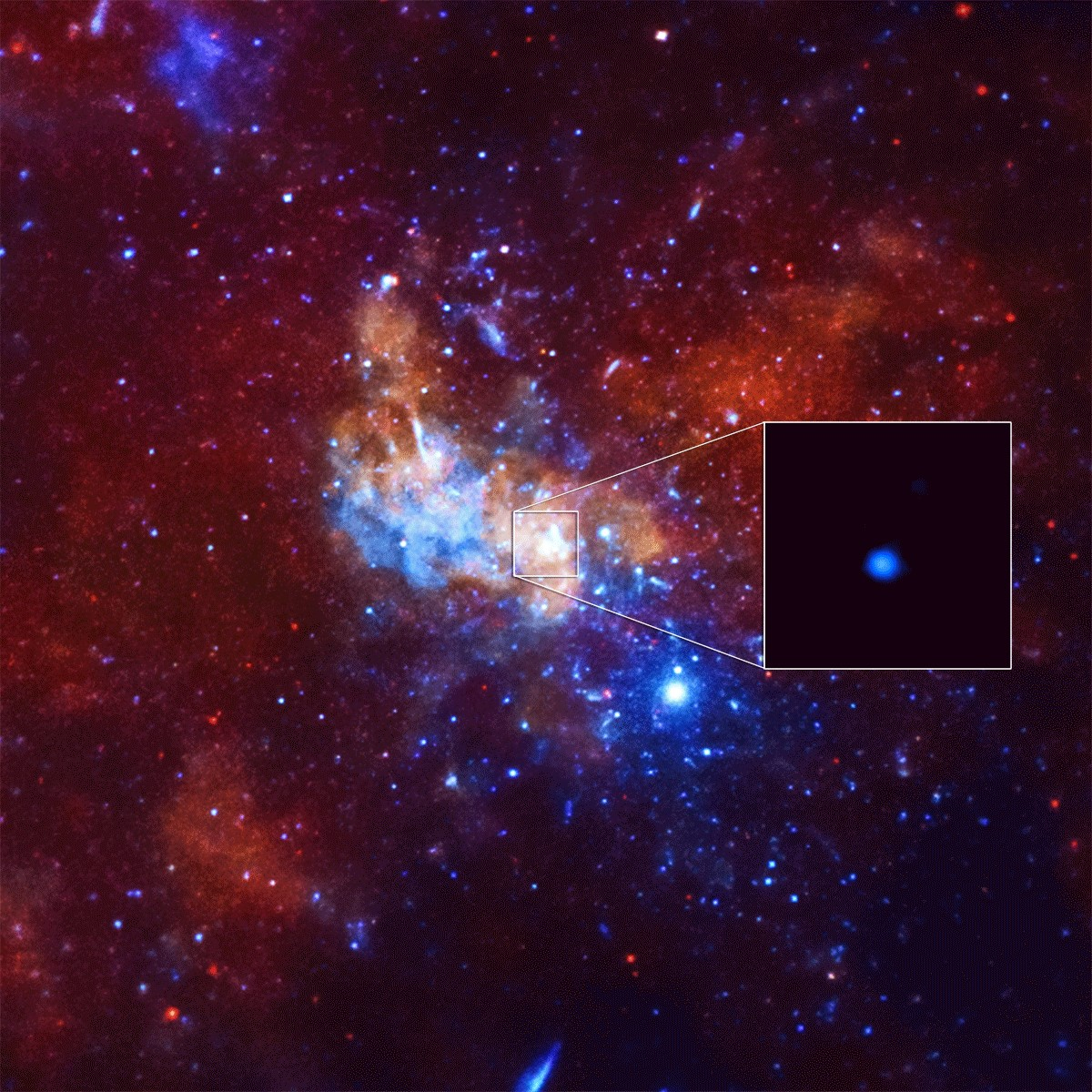
Detection of an unusually bright X-ray flare from Sagittarius A*, a black hole in the centre of the Milky Way galaxy in September 2013

Astronomers use the term active galaxy to describe galaxies with unusual characteristics, such as unusual spectral line emission and very strong radio emission. Theoretical and observational studies have shown that the high levels of activity in the centres of these galaxies, regions called active galactic nuclei (AGN), may be explained by accretion onto supermassive black holes. These AGN consist of a central black hole that may be millions or billions of times more massive than the Sun, a disk of interstellar gas and dust called an accretion disk, and two jets perpendicular to the accretion disk. The black holes in quiescent galaxies accrete matter more slowly or radiate less efficiently.

Although supermassive black holes are expected to be found in most AGN, only some galaxies' nuclei have been more carefully studied in attempts to both identify and measure the actual masses of the central supermassive black hole candidates. Some of the most notable galaxies with supermassive black hole candidates include the Andromeda Galaxy, Messier 32, Messier 87, the Sombrero Galaxy, and the Milky Way itself.

=== Microlensing ===
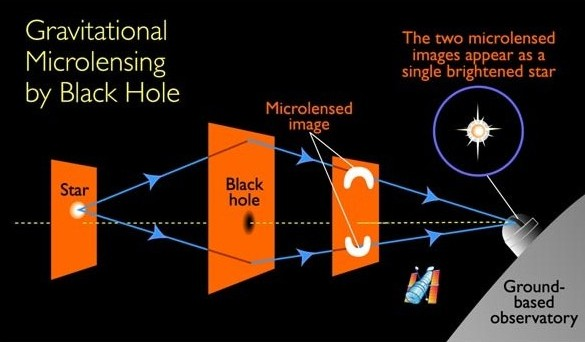
The intense gravitational field of a foreground black hole acts like a powerful lens, distorting and brightening the image of a background star.

Black holes can be detected by gravitational lensing: the deflection of light rays by the deformation of spacetime around a massive object. A distant star behind a source of gravity may produce multiple images of that star but if the images cannot be resolved, the phenomenon is called microlensing. In microlensing, astronomers see the star magnified by an amount which changes as the source star, lens, and observer move. Astronomers must monitor the star image over a few years and match its light curve to models of the gravitational effect. As a tool for astrophysics, microlensing is uniquely sensitive to dark objects like isolated black holes not paired in a binary object. However comparison of the predicted light curve to observations yields multiple indistinguishable solutions, requiring expensive follow-up measurements to select and confirm candidate black holes. Over 10,000 microlensing events yielded 23 black hole candidates but only one object has been confirmed as an isolated black hole using additional measurements from the Hubble Space Telescope.

== Areas of investigation ==
=== Information loss paradox ===
Unsolved problem in physics
Is physical information lost in black holes?
More unsolved problems in physics

According to the no-hair theorem, a black hole is defined by only three parameters: its mass, charge, and angular momentum. This seems to mean that all other information about the matter that went into forming the black hole is lost, as there is no way to determine anything about the black hole from outside other than those three parameters. When black holes were thought to persist forever, this information loss was not problematic, as the information can be thought of as existing inside the black hole. However, black holes slowly evaporate by emitting Hawking radiation. This radiation does not appear to carry any additional information about the matter that formed the black hole, meaning that this information is seemingly gone forever. This is called the black hole information paradox. Theoretical studies analysing the paradox have led to both further paradoxes and new ideas about the intersection of quantum mechanics and general relativity. While there is no consensus on the resolution of the paradox, work on the problem is expected to be important for a theory of quantum gravity.

=== Supermassive black holes in the early universe ===
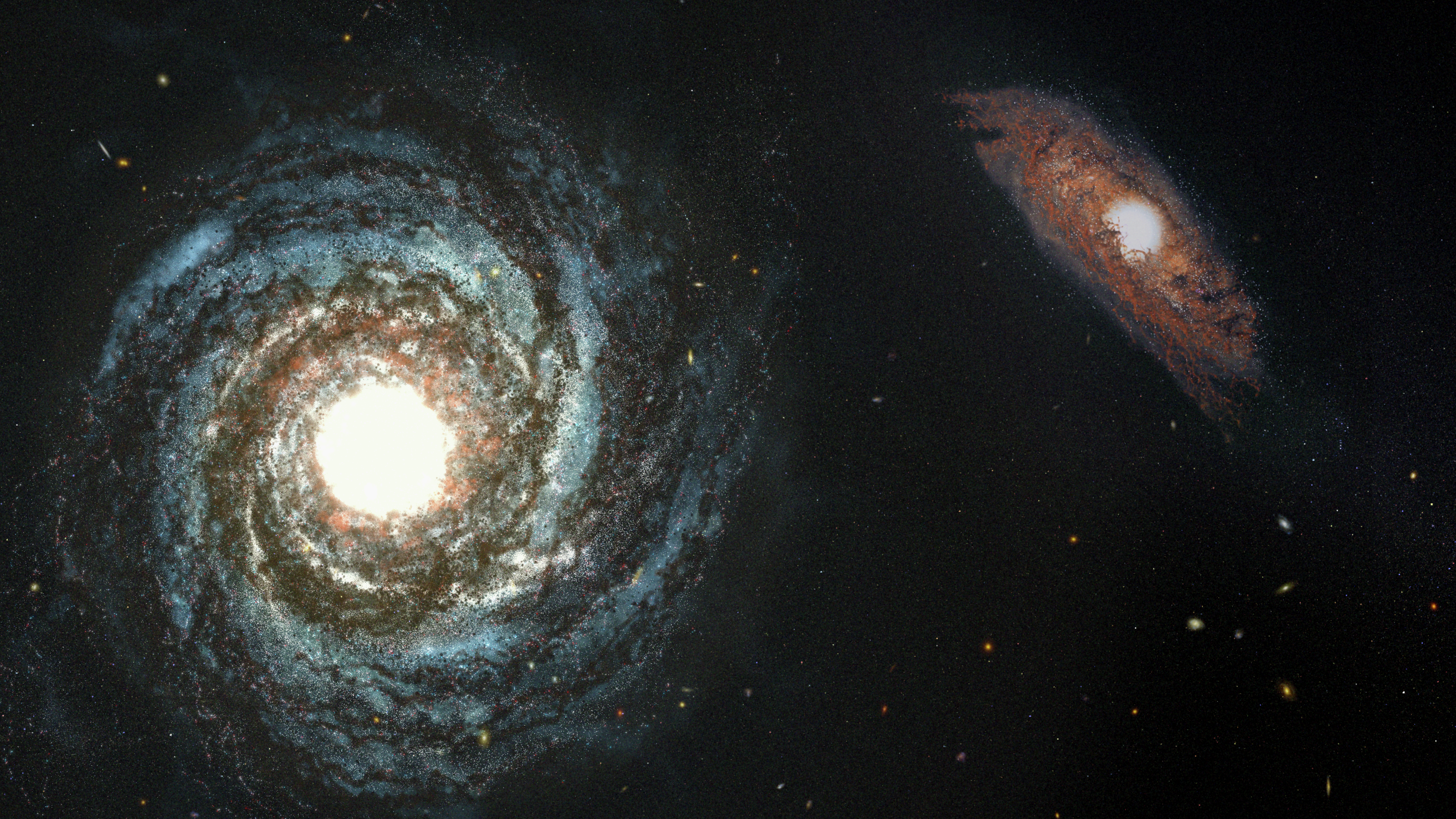
Two galaxies from the first billion years after the Big Bang. The galaxy on the left hosts a luminous quasar at its centre.

Observations of faraway galaxies have found that ultraluminous quasars, powered by supermassive black holes, existed in the early universe as far back as redshift $z\ge7,$ less than a billion years after the Big Bang. These black holes have been assumed to be the products of the gravitational collapse of large population III stars. However, these stellar remnants were not massive enough to produce the quasars observed at early times without accreting beyond the Eddington limit, the theoretical maximum rate of black hole accretion.

Physicists have suggested a variety of different mechanisms by which these supermassive black holes may have formed. It has been proposed that smaller black holes may have also undergone mergers to produce the observed supermassive black holes. It is also possible that they were seeded by direct-collapse black holes, in which a large cloud of hot gas avoids fragmentation that would lead to multiple stars, due to low angular momentum or heating from a nearby galaxy. Given the right circumstances, a single supermassive star forms and collapses directly into a black hole without undergoing typical stellar evolution. Additionally, these supermassive black holes in the early universe may be high-mass primordial black holes, which could have accreted further matter in the centres of galaxies. Finally, certain mechanisms allow black holes to grow faster than the theoretical Eddington limit, such as dense gas in the accretion disk limiting outward radiation pressure that prevents the black hole from accreting. However, the formation of bipolar jets prevents super-Eddington rates.

=== Alternatives to black holes ===
While there is a strong case for supermassive black holes, the dividing line between lighter black holes and neutron stars relies on theories of extremely dense matter. Direct observational tests are not available: objects observed to have mass higher than the predictions for neutron stars are assumed to be black holes. Recent evidence from gravitational wave events suggests modifications of these theories may be needed. New exotic phases of matter could allow other kinds of massive objects. Quark stars would be made up of quark matter and supported by quark degeneracy pressure, a form of degeneracy pressure even stronger than neutron degeneracy pressure. This would halt gravitational collapse at a higher mass than for a neutron star. Even stronger stars called electroweak stars would convert quarks in their cores into leptons, providing additional pressure to stop the star from collapsing. If, as some extensions of the Standard Model posit, quarks and leptons are made up of the even-smaller fundamental particles called preons, a very compact star could be supported by preon degeneracy pressure. While none of these hypothetical models can explain all of the observations of stellar black hole candidates, a Q star is the only alternative which could significantly exceed the mass limit for neutron stars and thus provide an alternative for supermassive black holes.

A few theoretical objects have been conjectured to match observations of astronomical black hole candidates identically or near-identically, but which function via a different mechanism. A dark energy star would convert infalling matter into vacuum energy; this vacuum energy would be much larger than the vacuum energy of outside space, exerting outwards pressure and preventing a singularity from forming. A black star would be gravitationally collapsing slowly enough that quantum effects would keep it just on the cusp of fully collapsing into a black hole. A gravastar would consist of a very thin shell and a dark-energy interior providing outward pressure to stop the collapse into a black hole or formation of a singularity; It could even have another gravastar inside, called a 'nestar'.

== In fiction ==
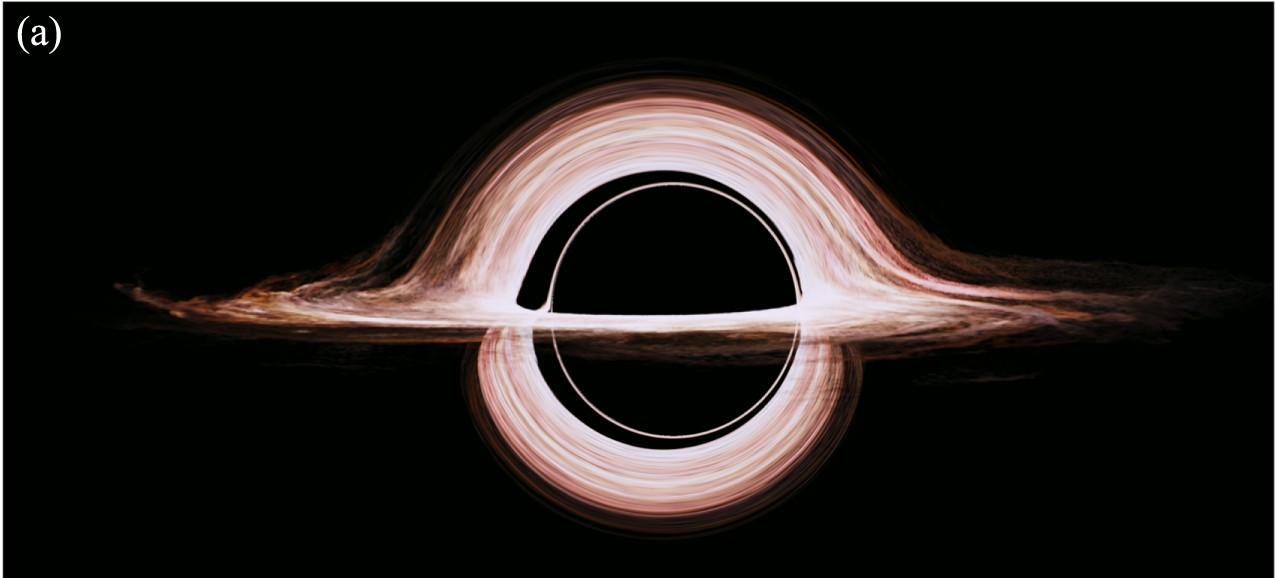
The black hole and accretion disk used in the movie Interstellar, without lens flare. The visual effects team used relativity to visualize gravitational lensing around the black hole.

The concept of black holes has inspired artists as well as scientists. In her book Conjuring the Void: the Art of Black Holes, Lynn Gamwell used black holes as an example to explore how art and science interact, considering the application of art to create scientific visualizations and the impact of scientific ideas on art concepts like darkness. Some science fiction films have incorporated relativity into their black hole visualizations, leading to results similar to images derived from the Event Horizon Telescope. Fictional treatments of black holes are also used as a mechanism for teaching science.

Black holes have been portrayed in science fiction in a variety of ways. Even before the advent of the term itself, objects with characteristics of black holes appeared in stories. In modern day, authors and screenwriters have exploited the relativistic effects of black holes, particularly gravitational time dilation. Black holes have also been appropriated as wormholes or other methods of faster-than-light travel.
