= History of black hole physics =

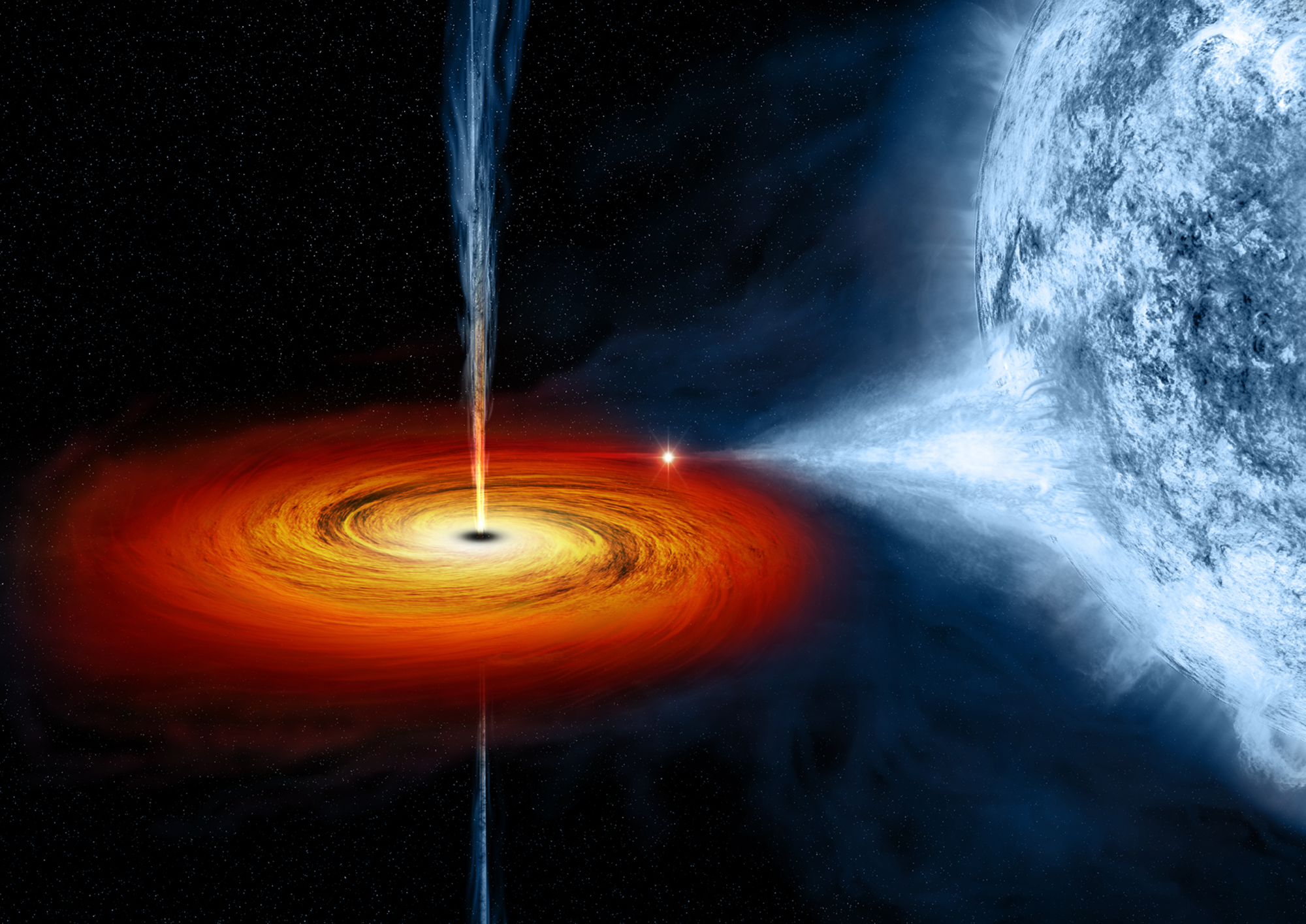
Illustration of the Cygnus X-1 binary system, which hosts the first widely recognized black hole

Black holes have primarily been subjects of research since the advent of general relativity in the early 1900s, although similar concepts were discussed before then. Several months after Albert Einstein first described general relativity in 1917, astrophysicist Karl Schwarzschild applied the model to stars and discovered a solution to the Einstein field equations containing singularities, which would later become known as the Schwarzschild solution. This solution was the foundation for Schwarzschild black holes: black holes with no spin or charge.

Initially, black holes were dismissed by early researchers as purely theoretical curiosities or even physically impossible. The emerging concept of degeneracy pressure led many physicists to believe that a yet-to-be-known mechanism would stop a star from collapsing into a black hole, no matter its mass. However, in 1939, J. Robert Oppenheimer and Hartland Snyder analyzed stellar collapse and determined that there seemed to be no mechanism that could prevent all stars from becoming black holes.

After Oppenheimer's and Snyder's discovery, black holes began to become more widely accepted among physicists, who began to further investigate and understand the Schwarzschild solution. Three more metrics were created to describe other kinds of black holes: the Reissner-Nordstrom metric, describing charged, nonspinning black holes, the Kerr metric, describing spinning, uncharged black holes, and the Kerr-Newman metric, describing spinning and charged black holes. Werner Israel later discovered that any black hole must be described by one of these parameters and can only have three properties: charge, mass, and spin.

Meanwhile, actual astronomical observations of black holes were beginning. The first widely recognized black hole, Cygnus X-1, was discovered in 1972 and accepted by most of the scientific community as a black hole by the end of 1973. Although Cygnus X-1 was a stellar black hole, evidence built for the existence of supermassive black holes as well, and the Hubble Space Telescope revealed that supermassive black holes were nearly ubiquitous in galactic centers. In more recent years, advances in interferometry have allowed scientists to take the first photo of a black hole and detect black hole mergers via gravitational waves.

== Before general relativity ==
The idea of a body so massive that even light could not escape was briefly proposed by English astronomical pioneer and clergyman John Michell and independently by French scientist Pierre-Simon Laplace. Both scholars proposed very large stars in contrast to the modern concept of an extremely dense object.

Michell's idea, in a short part of a letter published in 1784, calculated that a star with the same density but 500 times the radius of the sun would not let any emitted light escape; the surface escape velocity would exceed the speed of light. Michell correctly noted that such supermassive but non-radiating bodies might be detectable through their gravitational effects on nearby visible bodies.

In 1796, Laplace mentioned that a star could be invisible if it were sufficiently large while speculating on the origin of the Solar System in his book Exposition du Système du Monde. Franz Xaver von Zach asked Laplace for a mathematical analysis, which Laplace provided and published in a journal edited by von Zach. Laplace omitted his comment about invisible stars in later editions of his book, perhaps because Thomas Young's wave theory of light had cast doubt on the validity of the corpuscles of light used in Laplace's mathematical analysis.

== General relativity ==
In 1905, Albert Einstein showed that the laws of electromagnetism would be invariant under a Lorentz transformation: they would be identical for observers travelling at different velocities relative to each other. This discovery became known as the principle of special relativity. Although the laws of mechanics had already been shown to be invariant, gravity remained yet to be included. To add gravity to his theory of relativity, Einstein was guided by observations by Galileo Galilei, Isaac Newton and others which showed inertial mass equalled gravitational mass. In 1907, Einstein published a paper proposing his equivalence principle, the hypothesis that this equality means the two forms of mass have a common cause. Using the principle, Einstein predicted the redshift effect of gravity on light.

In 1911, Einstein predicted the deflection of light by massive bodies, but his analysis was premature and off by a factor of two.

By 1917, Einstein refined these ideas into his general theory of relativity, which explained how matter affects spacetime, which in turn affects the motion of other matter. This theory formed the basis for black hole physics.

=== Singular solutions in general relativity ===
Only a few months after Einstein published the field equations describing general relativity, astrophysicist Karl Schwarzschild set out to apply the idea to stars. He assumed spherical symmetry with no spin and found a solution to Einstein's equations. A few months after Schwarzschild, Johannes Droste, a student of Hendrik Lorentz, independently gave the same solution for the point mass using a different set of coordinates. At a certain radius from the center of the mass, the Schwarzschild solution became singular, meaning that some of the terms in the Einstein equations became infinite. The nature of this radius, which later became known as the Schwarzschild radius, was not understood at the time.

Many physicists of the early 20th century were skeptical of the existence of black holes. In a 1926 popular science book, Arthur Eddington discussed the idea of a star with mass compressed to its Schwarzschild radius, but his analysis was meant to illustrate issues in the then-poorly-understood theory of general relativity rather than to seriously analyze the problem: Eddington did not believe black holes existed. In 1939, Einstein himself used his theory of general relativity in an attempt to prove that black holes were impossible. His work relied on increasing pressure or increasing centrifugal force balancing the force of gravity so that the object would not collapse beyond its Schwarzschild radius. He missed the possibility that implosion would drive the system below this critical value.

== Gravity vs degeneracy pressure ==
By the 1920s, astronomers had classified a number of white dwarf stars as too cool and dense to be explained by the gradual cooling of ordinary stars. In 1926, Ralph Fowler showed that quantum-mechanical degeneracy pressure was larger than thermal pressure at these densities. In 1931, using a combination of special relativity and quantum mechanics, Subrahmanyan Chandrasekhar calculated that a non-rotating body of electron-degenerate matter below a certain limiting mass (now called the Chandrasekhar limit at 1.4 M_{☉}) is stable, and by 1934 he showed that this explained the catalog of white dwarf stars. At the same meeting where Chandrasekhar announced his results, Eddington pointed out that stars above this limit would radiate until they were sufficiently dense to prevent light from exiting, a conclusion he considered absurd. Eddington and, later, Lev Landau argued that some yet unknown mechanism would stop the collapse. They were partially correct: a white dwarf slightly more massive than the Chandrasekhar limit will collapse into a neutron star, which is itself stable. These arguments from senior scientists delayed acceptance of Chandrasekhar's model.

In the 1930s, Fritz Zwicky and Walter Baade studied stellar novae, focusing on exceptionally bright ones they called supernovae. Zwicky promoted the idea that supernovae produced stars with the density of atomic nuclei—neutron stars—but this idea was largely ignored. In 1937, Lev Landau published a detailed model of a nuclear core model for stellar cores, which caught the attention of Robert Oppenheimer. In 1939, based on Chandrasekhar's reasoning, Oppenheimer and George Volkoff predicted that neutron stars below a certain mass limit—now known as the Tolman–Oppenheimer–Volkoff limit—would be stable due to neutron degeneracy pressure. Above that limit, they reasoned that either their model would not apply or that gravitational contraction would not stop.

John Archibald Wheeler and two of his students resolved questions about the model behind the Tolman–Oppenheimer–Volkoff (TOV) limit. Harrison and Wheeler developed the equations of state relating density to pressure for cold matter all the way from atoms through electron degeneracy to neutron degeneracy. Masami Wakano and Wheeler then used the equations to compute the equilibrium curve for stars, relating mass to circumference. They found no additional features that would invalidate the TOV limit. This meant that the only thing that could prevent black holes from forming was a dynamic process ejecting sufficient mass from a star as it cooled. Wheeler held the view that the neutrons in an imploding star would convert to electromagnetic radiation fast enough that the resulting light would not be trapped in a black hole.

== Birth of modern model ==
The modern concept of black holes was formulated by Robert Oppenheimer and his student Hartland Snyder in 1939. In the paper, Oppenheimer and Snyder solved Einstein's equations of general relativity for an idealized imploding star, in a model later called the Oppenheimer–Snyder model, then described the results from far outside the star. The implosion starts as one might expect: the star material rapidly collapses inward. But as density of the star increases, gravitational time dilation increases and the collapse, viewed from afar, seems to slow down. Once the star reached a critical radius—its Schwarzschild radius—faraway viewers would no longer see the implosion. The light from the implosion would be infinitely redshifted and time dilation would be so extreme that it would appear frozen in time.

In 1958, David Finkelstein identified the Schwarzschild surface as an event horizon, calling it "a perfect unidirectional membrane: causal influences can cross it in only one direction". In this sense, events that occur inside of the black hole cannot affect events that occur outside of the black hole. Finkelstein created a new reference frame to include the point of view of infalling observers. Finkelstein's solution extended the Schwarzschild solution for the future of observers falling into a black hole. A similar concept had already been found by Martin Kruskal, but its significance had not been fully understood at the time. Finkelstein's new frame of reference allowed events at the event horizon of an imploding star to be related to events far away. By 1962 the two points of view were reconciled, convincing many skeptics that implosion into a black hole made physical sense.

== Golden age ==
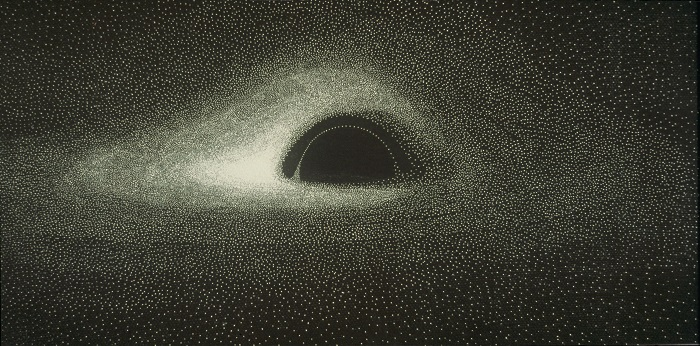
The first simulated image of a black hole, created by Jean-Pierre Luminet in 1978 and featuring the characteristic shadow, photon sphere, and lensed accretion disk. The disk is brighter on one side due to the Doppler beaming.

The era from the mid-1960s to the mid-1970s was the "golden age of black hole research", when general relativity and black holes became mainstream subjects of research.

In this period, more general black hole solutions were found. In 1963, Roy Kerr found the exact solution for a rotating black hole. Two years later, Ezra Newman found the cylindrically symmetric solution for a black hole that is both rotating and electrically charged.

In 1967, Werner Israel found that the Schwarzschild solution was the only possible solution for a nonspinning, uncharged black hole, and couldn't have any additional parameters. In that sense, a Schwarzschild black hole would be defined by its mass alone, and any two Schwarzschild black holes with the same mass would be identical. Israel later found that Reissner-Nordstrom black holes were only defined by their mass and electric charge, while Brandon Carter discovered that Kerr black holes only had two degrees of freedom, mass and spin. Together, these findings became known as the no-hair theorem, which states that a stationary black hole is completely described by the three parameters of the Kerr–Newman metric: mass, angular momentum, and electric charge. At first, it was suspected that the strange mathematical singularities found in each of the black hole solutions only appeared due to the assumption that a black hole would be perfectly spherically symmetric, and therefore the singularities would not appear in generic situations where black holes would not necessarily be symmetric. This view was held in particular by Vladimir Belinski, Isaak Khalatnikov, and Evgeny Lifshitz, who tried to prove that no singularities appear in generic solutions, although they would later reverse their positions. However, in 1965, Roger Penrose proved that general relativity without quantum mechanics requires that singularities appear in all black holes. Shortly afterwards, Hawking generalized Penrose's solution to find that in all but a few physically infeasible scenarios, a cosmological Big Bang singularity is inevitable unless quantum gravity intervenes.

Astronomical observations also made great strides during this era. In 1967, Antony Hewish and Jocelyn Bell Burnell discovered pulsars and by 1969, these were shown to be rapidly rotating neutron stars. Until that time, neutron stars, like black holes, were regarded as just theoretical curiosities, but the discovery of pulsars showed their physical relevance and spurred a further interest in all types of compact objects that might be formed by gravitational collapse. Based on observations in Greenwich and Toronto in the early 1970s, Cygnus X-1, a galactic X-ray source discovered in 1964, became the first astronomical object commonly accepted to be a black hole.

Work by James Bardeen, Jacob Bekenstein, Carter, and Hawking in the early 1970s led to the formulation of black hole thermodynamics. These laws describe the behaviour of a black hole in close analogy to the laws of thermodynamics by relating mass to energy, area to entropy, and surface gravity to temperature. The analogy was completed when Hawking, in 1974, showed that quantum field theory implies that black holes should radiate like a black body with a temperature proportional to the surface gravity of the black hole, predicting the effect now known as Hawking radiation.

== Modern research and observation ==
The first strong evidence for black holes came from combined X-ray and optical observations of Cygnus X-1 in 1972. The x-ray source, located in the Cygnus constellation, was discovered through a survey by two suborbital rockets, as the blocking of x-rays by Earth's atmosphere makes it difficult to detect them from the ground. Unlike stars or pulsars, Cygnus X-1 was not associated with any prominent radio or optical source. In 1972, Louise Webster, Paul Murdin, and, independently, Charles Thomas Bolton, found that Cygnus X-1 was actually in a binary system with the supergiant star HDE 226868. Using the emission patterns of the visible star, both research teams found that the mass of Cygnus X-1 was likely too large to be a white dwarf or neutron star, indicating that it was probably a black hole. Further research strengthened their hypothesis.

While Cygnus X-1, a stellar-mass black hole, was generally accepted by the scientific community as a black hole by the end of 1973, it would be decades before a supermassive black hole would gain the same broad recognition. Although, as early as the 1960s, physicists such as Donald Lynden-Bell and Martin Rees had suggested that powerful quasars in the center of galaxies were powered by accreting supermassive black holes, little observational proof existed at the time. However, the Hubble Space Telescope, launched decades later, found that supermassive black holes were not only present in these active galactic nuclei, but that supermassive black holes in the center of galaxies were ubiquitous: Almost every galaxy had a supermassive black hole at its center, many of which were quiescent.

Meanwhile, theoretical research on black holes was advancing. Before the 1970s, most physicists believed that the interior of a Schwarzschild black hole curved inwards towards a sharp point at the singularity. However, in the late 1960s, Soviet physicists Vladimir Belinskii, Isaak Khalatnikov, and Evgeny Lifshitz discovered that this model was only true when the spacetime inside the black hole had not been perturbed. Any perturbations, such as those caused by matter or radiation falling in, would cause space to oscillate chaotically near the singularity. Any matter falling in would experience intense tidal forces rapidly changing in direction, all while being compressed into an increasingly small volume. Physicists termed these oscillations Mixmaster dynamics, after a brand of mixer that was popular at the time that Belinskii, Khalatnikov, and Lifshitz made their discovery, because they have a similar effect on matter near a singularity as an electric mixer would have on dough.

In 1999, David Merritt proposed the M–sigma relation, which related the dispersion of the velocity of matter in the center bulge of a galaxy to the mass of the supermassive black hole at its core. Subsequent studies confirmed this correlation. Around the same time, based on telescope observations of the velocities of stars at the center of the Milky Way galaxy, independent work groups led by Andrea Ghez and Reinhard Genzel concluded that the compact radio source in the center of the galaxy, Sagittarius A*, was likely a supermassive black hole.

=== LIGO ===
The first detection of gravitational waves, imaged by LIGO observatories in Hanford Site, Washington and Livingston, Louisiana

On 11 February 2016, the LIGO Scientific Collaboration and Virgo Collaboration announced the first direct detection of gravitational waves, named GW150914, representing the first observation of a black hole merger. At the time of the merger, the black holes were approximately 1.4 billion light-years away from Earth and had masses of 30 and 35 solar masses. The mass of the resulting black hole was approximately 62 solar masses, with an additional three solar masses radiated away as gravitational waves. The Laser Interferometer Gravitational-Wave Observatory (LIGO) detected the gravitational waves by using two mirrors spaced four kilometers apart to measure microscopic changes in length. In 2017, Rainer Weiss, Kip Thorne, and Barry Barish, who had spearheaded the project, were awarded the Nobel Prize in Physics for their work. Since the initial discovery in 2015, hundreds more gravitational waves have been observed by LIGO and another interferometer, Virgo.

On 14 September 2015, the LIGO gravitational wave observatory made the first-ever successful direct observation of gravitational waves. The signal was consistent with theoretical predictions for the gravitational waves produced by the merger of two black holes: one with about 36 solar masses, and the other around 29 solar masses. The signal observed by LIGO also included the start of the post-merger ringdown, the signal produced as the newly formed compact object settles down to a stationary state. From the ringdown, the LIGO team was able to determine that the resulting merged black hole was spinning at 67% of the maximum rate and had a mass of 62 solar masses, having lost three solar masses as gravitational waves during the merger.

The observation also provides the first observational evidence for the existence of stellar-mass black hole binaries. Furthermore, it is the first observational evidence of stellar-mass black holes weighing 25 solar masses or more.

Since then, many more gravitational wave events have been observed.

=== EHT ===
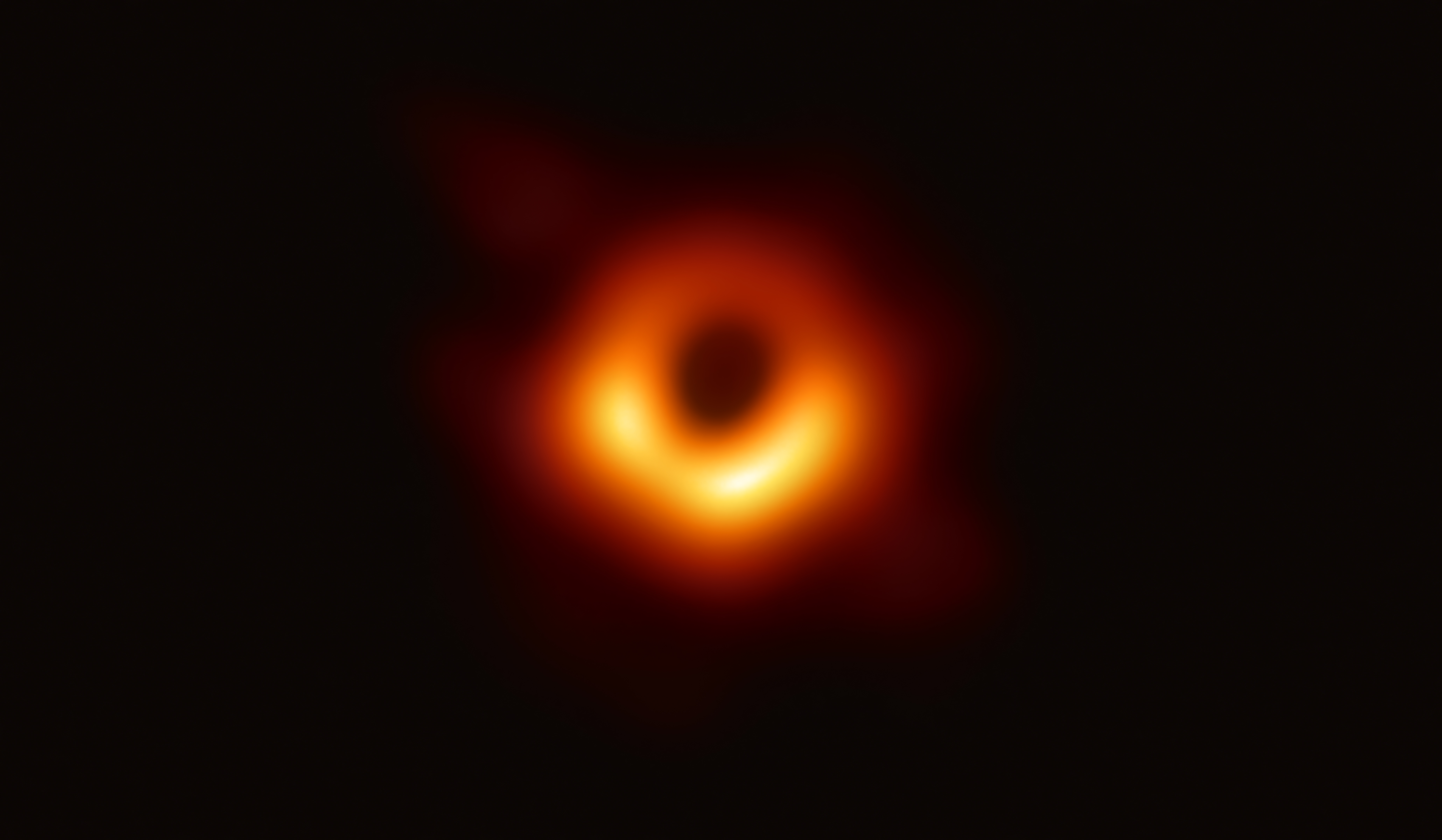
Image by the Event Horizon Telescope of the supermassive black hole in the center of Messier 87

On 10 April 2019, the first direct image of a black hole and its vicinity was published, following observations made by the Event Horizon Telescope (EHT) in 2017 of the supermassive black hole in Messier 87's galactic centre. The observations were carried out by eight observatories in six geographical locations across four days and totaled five petabytes of data. In 2022, the Event Horizon Telescope collaboration released an image of the black hole in the center of the Milky Way galaxy, Sagittarius A*; The data had been collected in 2017. Detailed analysis of the motion of stars recorded by the Gaia mission produced evidence in 2022 and 2023 of a black hole named Gaia BH1 in a binary with a Sun-like star about 1,560 light-years (480 parsecs) away. Gaia BH1 is currently the closest known black hole to Earth. Two more black holes have since been found from Gaia data, one in a binary with a red giant and the other in a binary with a G-type star.

In April 2019, the EHT team debuted the first image of the supermassive black hole at the center of the galaxy M87. The black hole's shadow appears as a dark circle in the centre of the image, bordered by the orange-red ring of its accretion disk. The bottom half of the disk is brighter than the top due to Doppler beaming: Material at the bottom of the disk, which is travelling towards the viewer at relativistic speeds, appears brighter than the material at the top of the disk, which is travelling away from the viewer. In April 2023, the EHT team presented an image of the shadow of the Messier 87 black hole and its high-energy jet, viewed together for the first time.

Sagittarius A*, the supermassive black hole in the center of the Milky Way

On 12 May 2022, the EHT released the first image of Sagittarius A*, the supermassive black hole at the centre of the Milky Way galaxy. The EHT team had previously detected magnetic field lines around the black hole, confirming theoretical predictions of magnetic fields around black holes. Like M87*, Sagittarius A*'s shadow and accretion disk can be seen in the EHT image, with the size of the shadow matching theoretical projections. Although the image of Sagittarius A* was created through the same process as for M87*, it was significantly more complex to image Sagittarius A* because of the instability of its surroundings. Because Sagittarius A* is one thousand times less massive as M87*, its accretion disk has a much shorter orbital period, so the environment around Sagittarius A* was rapidly changing as the EHT team was trying to image it. Additionally, turbulent plasma lies between Sagittarius A* and Earth, preventing resolution of the image at longer wavelengths.

== 2020 Nobel Prize ==
In 2020, the Nobel Prize in Physics was awarded for work on black holes. Andrea Ghez and Reinhard Genzel shared one-half for their discovery that Sagittarius A* is a supermassive black hole. Penrose received the other half for his work showing that the mathematics of general relativity requires the formation of black holes. Cosmologists lamented that Hawking's extensive theoretical work on black holes would not be honored since he died in 2018.

=== Etymology ===
In December 1967, a student reportedly suggested the phrase black hole at a lecture by John Wheeler; Wheeler adopted the term for its brevity and "advertising value", and Wheeler's stature in the field ensured it quickly caught on, leading some to credit Wheeler with coining the phrase.

However, the term was used by others around that time. Science writer Marcia Bartusiak traces the term black hole to physicist Robert H. Dicke, who in the early 1960s reportedly compared the phenomenon to the Black Hole of Calcutta, notorious as a prison where people entered but never left alive. The term was used in print by Life and Science News magazines in 1963, and by science journalist Ann Ewing in her article "'Black Holes' in Space", dated 18 January 1964, which was a report on a meeting of the American Association for the Advancement of Science held in Cleveland, Ohio.
