= Johannes Droste =

Dutch mathematician (1886–1963)

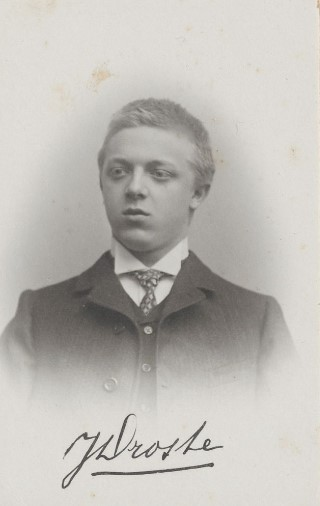
Droste (1908)

Johannes Droste (28 May 1886 – 16 September 1963) was a Dutch mathematician and theoretical physicist, who was the second person after Karl Schwarzschild to solve Einstein's field equation. He was a professor of mathematics at Leiden University from 1930 to 1956.

== Biography ==
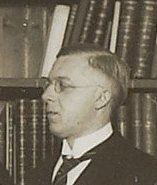

On 27 May 1916, a student of Hendrik Lorentz at the University of Leiden, Droste presented his solution of Einstein's equation to the Royal Netherlands Academy of Arts and Sciences. He obtained his doctorate in 1916. From 1914 to 1919, Droste taught mathematics at the gymnasium in Gorinchem. He then joined the University of Leiden and became professor of mathematics there in 1930. Devoting himself to the teaching of mathematical analysis, he abandoned his research in physics, with the exception of a few contributions in elasticity and thermodynamics.
