= Summation notation =

Summation notation may refer to:

- Capital-sigma notation, mathematical symbol for summation
- Einstein notation, summation over like-subscripted indices
