= Symmetric tensor =

Tensor invariant under permutations of vectors it acts on

In mathematics, a symmetric tensor is an unmixed tensor that is invariant under a permutation of its vector arguments:

$$T(v_1,v_2,\ldots,v_r) = T(v_{\sigma 1},v_{\sigma 2},\ldots,v_{\sigma r})$$

for every permutation σ of the symbols {1, 2, ..., r}. Alternatively, a symmetric tensor of order r represented in coordinates as a quantity with r indices satisfies

$$T_{i_1i_2\cdots i_r} = T_{i_{\sigma 1}i_{\sigma 2}\cdots i_{\sigma r}}.$$

The space of symmetric tensors of order r on a finite-dimensional vector space V is naturally isomorphic to the dual of the space of homogeneous polynomials of degree r on V. Over fields of characteristic zero, the graded vector space of all symmetric tensors can be naturally identified with the symmetric algebra on V. A related concept is that of the antisymmetric tensor or alternating form. Symmetric tensors occur widely in engineering, physics and mathematics.

== Definition ==
Let V be a vector space and

$$T\in V^{\otimes k}$$

a tensor of order k. Then T is a symmetric tensor if

$$\tau_\sigma T = T\,$$

for the braiding maps associated to every permutation σ on the symbols {1,2,...,k} (or equivalently for every transposition on these symbols).

Given a basis {e^{i}} of V, any symmetric tensor T of rank k can be written as

$$T = \sum_{i_1,\ldots,i_k=1}^N T_{i_1i_2\cdots i_k} e^{i_1} \otimes e^{i_2}\otimes\cdots \otimes e^{i_k}$$

for some unique list of coefficients $T_{i_1i_2\cdots i_k}$ (the components of the tensor in the basis) that are symmetric on the indices. That is to say

$$T_{i_{\sigma 1}i_{\sigma 2}\cdots i_{\sigma k}} = T_{i_1i_2\cdots i_k}$$

for every permutation σ.

The space of all symmetric tensors of order k defined on V is often denoted by S^{k}(V) or Sym^{k}(V). It is itself a vector space, and if V has dimension N then the dimension of Sym^{k}(V) is the binomial coefficient

$$\dim\operatorname{Sym}^k(V) = {N + k - 1 \choose k}.$$

We then construct Sym(V) as the direct sum of Sym^{k}(V) for k = 0,1,2,...

$$\operatorname{Sym}(V)= \bigoplus_{k=0}^\infty \operatorname{Sym}^k(V).$$

== Examples ==
There are many examples of symmetric tensors. Some include, the metric tensor, $g_{\mu\nu}$, the Einstein tensor, $G_{\mu\nu}$ and the Ricci tensor, $R_{\mu\nu}$.

Many material properties and fields used in physics and engineering can be represented as symmetric tensor fields; for example: stress, strain, and anisotropic conductivity. Also, in diffusion MRI one often uses symmetric tensors to describe diffusion in the brain or other parts of the body.

Ellipsoids are examples of algebraic varieties; and so, for general rank, symmetric tensors, in the guise of homogeneous polynomials, are used to define projective varieties, and are often studied as such.

Given a Riemannian manifold $(M,g)$ equipped with its Levi-Civita connection $\nabla$, the covariant curvature tensor is a symmetric order 2 tensor over the vector space $V = \Omega^2(M) = \bigwedge^2 T^*M$ of differential 2-forms. This corresponds to the fact that, viewing $R_{ijk\ell} \in (T^*M)^{\otimes 4}$, we have the symmetry $R_{ij\, k\ell} = R_{k\ell\, ij}$ between the first and second pairs of arguments in addition to antisymmetry within each pair: $R_{jik\ell} = - R_{ijk\ell} = R_{ij\ell k}$.

== Symmetric part of a tensor ==
Suppose $V$ is a vector space over a field of characteristic 0. If T ∈ V^{⊗k} is a tensor of order $k$, then the symmetric part of $T$ is the symmetric tensor defined by

$$\operatorname{Sym}\, T = \frac{1}{k!}\sum_{\sigma\in\mathfrak{S}_k} \tau_\sigma T,$$

the summation extending over the symmetric group on k symbols. In terms of a basis, and employing the Einstein summation convention, if

$$T = T_{i_1i_2\cdots i_k}e^{i_1}\otimes e^{i_2}\otimes\cdots \otimes e^{i_k},$$

then

$$\operatorname{Sym}\, T = \frac{1}{k!}\sum_{\sigma\in \mathfrak{S}_k} T_{i_{\sigma 1}i_{\sigma 2}\cdots i_{\sigma k}} e^{i_1}\otimes e^{i_2}\otimes\cdots \otimes e^{i_k}.$$

The components of the tensor appearing on the right are often denoted by

$$T_{(i_1i_2\cdots i_k)} = \frac{1}{k!}\sum_{\sigma\in \mathfrak{S}_k} T_{i_{\sigma 1}i_{\sigma 2}\cdots i_{\sigma k}}$$

with parentheses () around the indices being symmetrized. Square brackets [] are used to indicate anti-symmetrization.

== Symmetric product ==
If T is a simple tensor, given as a pure tensor product

$$T=v_1\otimes v_2\otimes\cdots \otimes v_r$$

then the symmetric part of T is the symmetric product of the factors:

$$v_1\odot v_2\odot\cdots\odot v_r := \frac{1}{r!}\sum_{\sigma\in\mathfrak{S}_r} v_{\sigma 1}\otimes v_{\sigma 2}\otimes\cdots\otimes v_{\sigma r}.$$

In general we can turn Sym(V) into an algebra by defining the commutative and associative product ⊙. Given two tensors T_{1} ∈ Sym^{k_{1}}(V) and T_{2} ∈ Sym^{k_{2}}(V), we use the symmetrization operator to define:

$$T_1\odot T_2 = \operatorname{Sym}(T_1\otimes T_2)\quad\left(\in\operatorname{Sym}^{k_1+k_2}(V)\right).$$

It can be verified (as is done by Kostrikin and Manin) that the resulting product is in fact commutative and associative. In some cases the operator is omitted: T_{1}T_{2} = T_{1} ⊙ T_{2}.

In some cases an exponential notation is used:

$$v^{\odot k} = \underbrace{v \odot v \odot \cdots \odot v}_{k\text{ times}}=\underbrace{v \otimes v \otimes \cdots \otimes v}_{k\text{ times}}=v^{\otimes k}.$$

Where v is a vector. Again, in some cases the ⊙ is left out:

$$v^k=\underbrace{v\,v\,\cdots\,v}_{k\text{ times}}=\underbrace{v\odot v\odot\cdots\odot v}_{k\text{ times}}.$$

== Decomposition ==
In analogy with the theory of symmetric matrices, a (real) symmetric tensor of order 2 can be "diagonalized". More precisely, for any tensor T ∈ Sym^{2}(V), there is an integer r, non-zero unit vectors v_{1},...,v_{r} ∈ V and weights λ_{1},...,λ_{r} such that

$$T = \sum_{i=1}^r \lambda_i \, v_i\otimes v_i.$$

The minimum number r for which such a decomposition is possible is the (symmetric) rank of T. The vectors appearing in this minimal expression are the principal axes of the tensor, and generally have an important physical meaning. For example, the principal axes of the inertia tensor define the Poinsot's ellipsoid representing the moment of inertia. Also see Sylvester's law of inertia.

For symmetric tensors of arbitrary order k, decompositions

$$T = \sum_{i=1}^r \lambda_i \, v_i^{\otimes k}$$

are also possible. The minimum number r for which such a decomposition is possible is the symmetric rank of T. This minimal decomposition is called a Waring decomposition; it is a symmetric form of the tensor rank decomposition. For second-order tensors this corresponds to the rank of the matrix representing the tensor in any basis, and it is well known that the maximum rank is equal to the dimension of the underlying vector space. However, for higher orders this need not hold: the rank can be higher than the number of dimensions in the underlying vector space. Moreover, the rank and symmetric rank of a symmetric tensor may differ.

== See also ==
- Antisymmetric tensor
- Ricci calculus
- Schur polynomial
- Symmetric polynomial
- Transpose
- Young symmetrizer
