= Antisymmetric tensor =

Tensor equal to the negative of any of its transpositions

In mathematics and theoretical physics, a tensor is antisymmetric or alternating on (or with respect to) an index subset if it alternates sign (+/−) when any two indices of the subset are interchanged. The index subset must generally either be all covariant or all contravariant.

For example, $T_{ijk\dots} = -T_{jik\dots} = T_{jki\dots} = -T_{kji\dots} = T_{kij\dots} = -T_{ikj\dots}$ holds when the tensor is antisymmetric with respect to its first three indices.

If a tensor changes sign under exchange of each pair of its indices, then the tensor is completely (or totally) antisymmetric. A completely antisymmetric covariant tensor field of order $k$ may be referred to as a differential $k$-form, and a completely antisymmetric contravariant tensor field may be referred to as a $k$-vector field.

== Antisymmetric and symmetric tensors ==
A tensor A that is antisymmetric on indices $i$ and $j$ has the property that the contraction with a tensor B that is symmetric on indices $i$ and $j$ is identically 0.

For a general tensor U with components $U_{ijk\dots}$ and a pair of indices $i$ and $j,$ U has symmetric and antisymmetric parts defined as:

$U_{(ij)k\dots}=\frac{1}{2}(U_{ijk\dots}+U_{jik\dots})$	(symmetric part)
$U_{[ij]k\dots}=\frac{1}{2}(U_{ijk\dots}-U_{jik\dots})$	(antisymmetric part).

Similar definitions can be given for other pairs of indices. As the term "part" suggests, a tensor is the sum of its symmetric part and antisymmetric part for a given pair of indices, as in $U_{ijk\dots} = U_{(ij)k\dots} + U_{[ij]k\dots}.$

== Notation ==
A shorthand notation for anti-symmetrization is denoted by a pair of square brackets. For example, in arbitrary dimensions, for an order 2 covariant tensor M, $M_{[ab]} = \frac{1}{2!}(M_{ab} - M_{ba}),$ and for an order 3 covariant tensor T, $T_{[abc]} = \frac{1}{3!}(T_{abc}-T_{acb}+T_{bca}-T_{bac}+T_{cab}-T_{cba}).$

In any 2 and 3 dimensions, these can be written as
$$\begin{align}
M_{[ab]} &= \frac{1}{2!} \, \delta_{ab}^{cd} M_{cd} , \\[2pt]
T_{[abc]} &= \frac{1}{3!} \, \delta_{abc}^{def} T_{def} .
\end{align}$$
where $\delta_{ab\dots}^{cd\dots}$ is the generalized Kronecker delta, and the Einstein summation convention is in use.

More generally, irrespective of the number of dimensions, antisymmetrization over $p$ indices may be expressed as $T_{[a_1 \dots a_p]} = \frac{1}{p!} \delta_{a_1 \dots a_p}^{b_1 \dots b_p} T_{b_1 \dots b_p}.$

In general, every tensor of rank 2 can be decomposed into a symmetric and anti-symmetric pair as: $T_{ij} = \frac{1}{2}(T_{ij} + T_{ji}) + \frac{1}{2}(T_{ij} - T_{ji}).$

This decomposition is not in general true for tensors of rank 3 or more, which have more complex symmetries.

== Examples ==
Totally antisymmetric tensors include:

- Trivially, all scalars and vectors (tensors of order 0 and 1) are totally antisymmetric (as well as being totally symmetric).
- The electromagnetic tensor, $F_{\mu\nu}$ in electromagnetism.
- The Riemannian volume form on a pseudo-Riemannian manifold.

== See also ==
- Antisymmetric matrix – Form of a matrix
- Exterior algebra – Algebra associated to any vector space
- Levi-Civita symbol – Antisymmetric permutation object acting on tensors
- Ricci calculus – Tensor index notation for tensor-based calculations
- Symmetric tensor – Tensor invariant under permutations of vectors it acts on
- Symmetrization – process that converts any function in n variables to a symmetric function in n variables
