= Musical isomorphism =

Isomorphism between the tangent and cotangent bundles of a manifold

In mathematics—more specifically, in differential geometry—the musical isomorphism (or canonical isomorphism) is an isomorphism between the tangent bundle $\mathrm{T}M$ and the cotangent bundle $\mathrm{T}^* M$ of a Riemannian or pseudo-Riemannian manifold induced by its metric tensor. There are similar isomorphisms on symplectic manifolds. These isomorphisms are global versions of the canonical isomorphism between an inner product space and its dual. The term musical refers to the use of the musical notation symbols $\flat$ (flat) and $\sharp$ (sharp).

In the notation of Ricci calculus and mathematical physics, the idea is expressed as the raising and lowering of indices. Raising and lowering indices are a form of index manipulation in tensor expressions.

In certain specialized applications, such as on Poisson manifolds, the relationship may fail to be an isomorphism at singular points, and so, for these cases, is technically only a homomorphism.

== Motivation ==
The index-raising isomorphism is a coordinate-free way to define the gradient of a function $\text{grad} f = (df)^\sharp$ from its exterior derivative.

In linear algebra, a finite-dimensional vector space is isomorphic to its dual space (the space of linear functionals mapping the vector space to its base field), but not canonically. Given a fixed basis for this vector space, there is a natural way to go back and forth between vectors and linear forms: vectors are represented in the basis by column vectors, linear forms are represented in the basis by row vectors, and the identification is done by transposition.

On the other hand, a finite-dimensional vector space $V$ endowed with a non-degenerate bilinear form $\langle\cdot,\cdot\rangle$ is canonically isomorphic to its dual. The canonical isomorphism $V \to V^*$ is given by

$$v \mapsto \langle v, \cdot \rangle$$.

An example is where $V = \mathbb R^n$ and $\langle\cdot,\cdot\rangle$ is the dot product.

In a basis $e_i$, the canonical isomorphism above can be described as follows. Let $g_{ij} = \langle e_i,e_j \rangle$ be the components of the non-degenerate bilinear form and let $g^{ij}$ be the components of the inverse matrix to $g_{ij}$. Let $e^i$ be the dual basis of $e_i$. A vector $v$ is written in the basis as $v = v^i e_i$ using Einstein summation notation, i.e., $v$ has components $v^i$ in the basis. The canonical isomorphism applied to $v$ gives an element of the dual, which is called a covector. The covector has components $v_i$ in the dual basis given by contracting with $g$:

$$v_i = g_{ij}v^j.$$

This is what is meant by lowering the index. Conversely, contracting a covector $\alpha = \alpha_i e^i$ with the inverse of $g$ gives a vector with components

$$\alpha^i = g^{ij}\alpha_j.$$

in the basis $e_i$. This process is called raising the index.

Raising and then lowering the same index (or conversely) are inverse operations, which is reflected in $g_{ij}$ and $g^{ij}$ being inverses:

$$g^{ij}g_{jk}=g_{kj}g^{ji}={\delta^i}_k={\delta_k}^i$$

where $\delta^i_j$ is the Kronecker delta or identity matrix.

The musical isomorphisms are the global version of the canonical isomorphism $v \mapsto \langle v, \cdot \rangle$ and its inverse for the tangent bundle and cotangent bundle of a (pseudo-)Riemannian manifold $(M,g)$. They are canonical isomorphisms of vector bundles that are defined on every tangent space $T_pM$ for $p\in M$ by
$$v\in T_pM \mapsto g_p(v,\cdot) \in (T_pM)^\ast$$
and its inverse

Because every smooth manifold can be (non-canonically) endowed with a Riemannian metric, the musical isomorphisms show that a vector bundle on a smooth manifold is (non-canonically) isomorphic to its dual.

Abstractly, the musical isomorphisms can be understood as a currying of the bilinear form.

== Discussion ==
Let $(M,g)$ be a (pseudo-)Riemannian manifold. At each point $p$, the map $g_p$ is a non-degenerate bilinear form on the tangent space $T_pM$. If $v$ is a vector in $T_pM$, its flat is the covector

$$v^\flat = g_p(v,\cdot)$$

in $T_p^*M$. Since this is a smooth map that preserves the point $p$, it defines a morphism of smooth vector bundles $\flat:\mathrm{T}M \to \mathrm{T}^*M$. By non-degeneracy of the metric, $\flat$ has an inverse $\sharp$ at each point, characterized by

$$g_p(\alpha^\sharp, v) = \alpha(v)$$

for $\alpha$ in $T_p^*M$ and $v$ in $T_pM$. The vector $\alpha^\sharp$ is called the sharp of $\alpha$. The sharp map is a smooth bundle map $\sharp:\mathrm{T}^*M \to \mathrm{T}M$.

Flat and sharp are mutually inverse isomorphisms of smooth vector bundles, hence, for each $p$ in $M$, there are mutually inverse vector space isomorphisms between $T_pM$ and $T_p^*M$.

The flat and sharp maps can be applied to vector fields and covector fields by applying them to each point. Hence, if $X$ is a vector field and $\omega$ is a covector field,

$$X^\flat = g(X,\cdot)$$

and

$$g(\omega^\sharp, X) = \omega(X)$$.

=== In a moving frame ===
Suppose {e_{i}} is a moving tangent frame (see also smooth frame) for the tangent bundle TM with, as dual frame (see also dual basis), the moving coframe (a moving tangent frame for the cotangent bundle $\mathrm{T}^*M$; see also coframe) {e^{i}}. Then the pseudo-Riemannian metric, which is a 2-covariant tensor field, can be written locally in this coframe as g = g_{ij}e^{i} ⊗ e^{j} using Einstein summation notation.

Given a vector field X = X^{i}e_{i} and denoting g_{ij} X^{i} = X_{j}, its flat is

$$X^\flat = g_{ij} X^i \mathbf{e}^j = X_j \mathbf{e}^j$$.

This is referred to as lowering an index, because the components of X are written with an upper index X^{i}, whereas the components of $X^\flat$ are written with a lower index X_{j}.

In the same way, given a covector field ω = ω_{i} e^{i} and denoting g^{ij} ω_{i} = ω^{j}, its sharp is

$$\omega^\sharp = g^{ij} \omega_i \mathbf{e}_j = \omega^j \mathbf{e}_j$$,

where g^{ij} are the components of the inverse metric tensor (given by the entries of the inverse matrix to g_{ij}). Taking the sharp of a covector field is referred to as raising an index.

=== Extension to tensor products ===
The musical isomorphisms may also be extended, for each r, s, k, to an isomorphism between the bundle

$$\bigotimes_{i=1}^s {\rm T} M \otimes \bigotimes_{j=1}^{r} {\rm T}^* M$$

of $(r,s)$ tensors and the bundle of $(r-k,s+k)$ tensors. Here k can be positive or negative, so long as r - k ≥ 0 and s + k ≥ 0.

Lowering an index of an $(r,s)$ tensor gives a $(r-1,s+1)$ tensor, while raising an index gives a $(r+1,s-1)$. Which index is to be raised or lowered must be indicated.

For instance, consider the (0, 2) tensor X = X_{ij}e^{i} ⊗ e^{j}. Raising the second index, we get the (1, 1) tensor

$$X^\sharp = g^{jk} X_{ij} \, {\rm e}^i \otimes {\rm e}_k .$$

In other words, the components $X_i^k$ of $X^\sharp$ are given by

$$X_i^k = g^{jk} X_{ij}.$$

Similar formulas are available for tensors of other orders. For example, for a $(0,n)$ tensor X, all indices are raised by:

$$X^{j_1j_2\cdots j_n} = g^{j_1i_1}g^{j_2i_2}\cdots g^{j_ni_n}X_{i_1i_2\cdots i_n}.$$

For a $(n,0)$ tensor X, all indices are lowered by:

$$X_{j_1j_2\cdots j_n} = g_{j_1i_1}g_{j_2i_2}\cdots g_{j_ni_n}X^{i_1i_2\cdots i_n}.$$

For a mixed tensor of order $(n,m)$, all lower indices are raised and all upper indices are lowered by

$${X_{p_1p_2\cdots p_n}}^{q_1q_2\cdots q_m} = g_{p_1i_1}g_{p_2i_2}\cdots g_{p_ni_n}g^{q_1j_1}g^{q_2j_2}\cdots g^{q_mj_m}{X^{i_1i_2\cdots i_n}}_{j_1j_2\cdots j_m}.$$

Well-formulated expressions are constrained by the rules of Einstein summation notation: any index may appear at most twice and furthermore a raised index must contract with a lowered index. With these rules we can immediately see that an expression such as $g_{ij}v^iu^j$ is well formulated while $g_{ij}v_iu_j$ is not.

=== Extension to k-vectors and k-forms ===
In the context of exterior algebra, an extension of the musical operators may be defined on ⋀V and its dual ⋀V ^{*}, and are again mutual inverses:

$$\flat : \bigwedge_{i=1}^k V \to \bigwedge_{i=1}^k V^*,$$
$$\sharp : \bigwedge_{i=1}^k V^* \to \bigwedge_{i=1}^k V,$$

defined by

$$(X \wedge \ldots \wedge Z)^\flat = X^\flat \wedge \ldots \wedge Z^\flat,$$
$$(\alpha \wedge \ldots \wedge \gamma)^\sharp = \alpha^\sharp \wedge \ldots \wedge \gamma^\sharp.$$

In this extension, in which ♭ maps k-vectors to k-covectors and ♯ maps k-covectors to k-vectors, all the indices of a totally antisymmetric tensor are simultaneously raised or lowered, and so no index need be indicated:
$$Y^\sharp = ( Y_{i_1 \dots i_j} \mathbf{e}^{i_1} \otimes \dots \otimes \mathbf{e}^{i_j})^\sharp = g^{i_1 r_1} \dots g^{i_j r_s} \, Y_{i_1 \dots i_k} \, \mathbf{e}_{r_1} \otimes \dots \otimes \mathbf{e}_{r_s}.$$

This works not just for k-vectors in the context of linear algebra but also for k-forms in the context of a (pseudo-)Riemannian manifold:

$$\flat : \bigwedge_{i=1}^k {\rm T} M \to \bigwedge_{i=1}^k {\rm T}^* M,$$
$$\sharp : \bigwedge_{i=1}^k {\rm T}^* M \to \bigwedge_{i=1}^k {\rm T} M,$$

=== Vector bundles with bundle metrics ===
More generally, musical isomorphisms always exist between a vector bundle endowed with a bundle metric and its dual.

== Trace of a tensor ==
Given a (0, 2) tensor X = X_{ij}e^{i} ⊗ e^{j}, we define the trace of X through the metric tensor g by
$$\operatorname{tr}_g ( X ) := \operatorname{tr} ( X^\sharp ) = \operatorname{tr} ( g^{jk} X_{ij} \, {\bf e}^i \otimes {\bf e}_k ) = g^{ij} X_{ij} .$$

Observe that the definition of trace is independent of the choice of index to raise, since the metric tensor is symmetric.

The trace of an $(r, s)$ tensor can be taken in a similar way, so long as one specifies which two distinct indices are to be traced. This process is also called contracting the two indices. For example, if X is an $(r, s)$ tensor with r > 1, then the indices $i_1$ and $i_2$ can be contracted to give an $(r-2, s)$ tensor with components

$$X^{i_3i_4 \cdots i_r}_{j_1j_2\cdots j_s} = g_{i_1i_2} X^{i_1i_2\cdots i_r}_{j_1j_2\cdots j_s}.$$

== Example computations ==
=== In Minkowski spacetime ===
The covariant 4-position is given by

$$X_\mu = (-ct, x, y, z)$$

with components:

$$X_0 = -ct, \quad X_1 = x, \quad X_2 = y, \quad X_3 = z$$

(where x,y,z are the usual Cartesian coordinates) and the Minkowski metric tensor with metric signature (− + + +) is defined as

$$\eta_{\mu \nu} = \eta^{\mu \nu} = \begin{pmatrix}
-1 & 0 & 0 & 0 \\
0 & 1 & 0 & 0 \\
0 & 0 & 1 & 0 \\
0 & 0 & 0 & 1
\end{pmatrix}$$

in components:

$$\eta_{00} = -1, \quad \eta_{i0} = \eta_{0i} = 0,\quad \eta_{ij} = \delta_{ij}\,(i,j \neq 0).$$

To raise the index, multiply by the tensor and contract:

$$X^\lambda = \eta^{\lambda\mu}X_\mu = \eta^{\lambda 0}X_0 + \eta^{\lambda i}X_i$$

then for λ = 0:

$$X^0 = \eta^{00}X_0 + \eta^{0i}X_i = -X_0$$

and for λ = j = 1, 2, 3:

$$X^j = \eta^{j0}X_0 + \eta^{ji}X_i = \delta^{ji}X_i = X_j \,.$$

So the index-raised contravariant 4-position is:

$$X^\mu = (ct, x, y, z)\,.$$

This operation is equivalent to the matrix multiplication

$$\begin{pmatrix}
-1 & 0 & 0 & 0 \\
0 & 1 & 0 & 0 \\
0 & 0 & 1 & 0 \\
0 & 0 & 0 & 1
\end{pmatrix} \begin{pmatrix}
-ct \\
x \\
y \\
z
\end{pmatrix} = \begin{pmatrix}
ct \\
x \\
y \\
z
\end{pmatrix}.$$

Given two vectors, $X^\mu$ and $Y^\mu$, we can write down their (pseudo-)inner product in two ways:

$$\eta_{\mu\nu}X^\mu Y^\nu.$$

By lowering indices, we can write this expression as

$$X_\mu Y^\mu.$$

In matrix notation, the first expression can be written as

$$\begin{pmatrix} X^0 & X^1 & X^2 & X^3 \end{pmatrix} \begin{pmatrix}
-1 & 0 & 0 & 0 \\
0 & 1 & 0 & 0 \\
0 & 0 & 1 & 0 \\
0 & 0 & 0 & 1
\end{pmatrix} \begin{pmatrix}
Y^0 \\
Y^1 \\
Y^2 \\
Y^3\end{pmatrix}$$

while the second is, after lowering the indices of $X^\mu$,

$$\begin{pmatrix} -X^0 & X^1 & X^2 & X^3 \end{pmatrix}\begin{pmatrix}
Y^0 \\
Y^1 \\
Y^2 \\
Y^3\end{pmatrix}.$$

=== In electromagnetism ===
For a (0,2) tensor, twice contracting with the inverse metric tensor and contracting in different indices raises each index:

$$A^{\mu\nu}=g^{\mu\rho}g^{\nu\sigma}A_{\rho \sigma}.$$

Similarly, twice contracting with the metric tensor and contracting in different indices lowers each index:

$$A_{\mu\nu}=g_{\mu\rho}g_{\nu\sigma}A^{\rho\sigma}$$

Let's apply this to the theory of electromagnetism.

The contravariant electromagnetic tensor in the (+ − − −) signature is given by

$$F^{\alpha\beta} = \begin{pmatrix}
0 & -\frac{E_x}{c} & -\frac{E_y}{c} & -\frac{E_z}{c} \\
\frac{E_x}{c} & 0 & -B_z & B_y \\
\frac{E_y}{c} & B_z & 0 & -B_x \\
\frac{E_z}{c} & -B_y & B_x & 0
\end{pmatrix}.$$

In components,

$$F^{0i} = -F^{i0} = - \frac{E^i}{c} ,\quad F^{ij} = - \varepsilon^{ijk} B_k$$

To obtain the covariant tensor F_{αβ}, contract with the inverse metric tensor:

$$\begin{align}
F_{\alpha\beta} & = \eta_{\alpha\gamma} \eta_{\beta\delta} F^{\gamma\delta} \\
& = \eta_{\alpha 0} \eta_{\beta 0} F^{0 0} + \eta_{\alpha i} \eta_{\beta 0} F^{i 0}
+ \eta_{\alpha 0} \eta_{\beta i} F^{0 i} + \eta_{\alpha i} \eta_{\beta j} F^{i j}
\end{align}$$

and since F^{00} = 0 and F^{0i} = − F^{i}^{0}, this reduces to

$$F_{\alpha\beta} = \left(\eta_{\alpha i} \eta_{\beta 0} - \eta_{\alpha 0} \eta_{\beta i} \right) F^{i 0} + \eta_{\alpha i} \eta_{\beta j} F^{i j}$$

Now for α = 0, β = k = 1, 2, 3:

$$\begin{align}
F_{0k} & = \left(\eta_{0i} \eta_{k0} - \eta_{00} \eta_{ki} \right) F^{i0} + \eta_{0i} \eta_{kj} F^{ij} \\
& = \bigl(0 - (-\delta_{ki}) \bigr) F^{i0} + 0 \\
& = F^{k0} = - F^{0k} \\
\end{align}$$

and by antisymmetry, for α = k = 1, 2, 3, β = 0:

$$F_{k0} = - F^{k0}$$

then finally for α = k = 1, 2, 3, β = l = 1, 2, 3;

$$\begin{align}
F_{kl} & = \left(\eta_{ k  i} \eta_{ l  0} - \eta_{ k  0} \eta_{ l  i} \right) F^{i 0} + \eta_{ k  i} \eta_{ l  j} F^{i j} \\
& = 0 + \delta_{ k  i} \delta_{ l  j} F^{i j} \\
& = F^{k l} \\
\end{align}$$

The (covariant) lower indexed tensor is then:

$$F_{\alpha\beta} = \begin{pmatrix}
0 & \frac{E_x}{c} & \frac{E_y}{c} & \frac{E_z}{c} \\
-\frac{E_x}{c} & 0 & -B_z & B_y \\
-\frac{E_y}{c} & B_z & 0 & -B_x \\
-\frac{E_z}{c} & -B_y & B_x & 0
\end{pmatrix}$$

This operation is equivalent to the matrix multiplication

$$\begin{pmatrix}
-1 & 0 & 0 & 0 \\
0 & 1 & 0 & 0 \\
0 & 0 & 1 & 0 \\
0 & 0 & 0 & 1
\end{pmatrix}
\begin{pmatrix}
0 & -\frac{E_x}{c} & -\frac{E_y}{c} & -\frac{E_z}{c} \\
\frac{E_x}{c} & 0 & -B_z & B_y \\
\frac{E_y}{c} & B_z & 0 & -B_x \\
\frac{E_z}{c} & -B_y & B_x & 0
\end{pmatrix}
\begin{pmatrix}
-1 & 0 & 0 & 0 \\
0 & 1 & 0 & 0 \\
0 & 0 & 1 & 0 \\
0 & 0 & 0 & 1
\end{pmatrix}
=\begin{pmatrix}
0 & \frac{E_x}{c} & \frac{E_y}{c} & \frac{E_z}{c} \\
-\frac{E_x}{c} & 0 & -B_z & B_y \\
-\frac{E_y}{c} & B_z & 0 & -B_x \\
-\frac{E_z}{c} & -B_y & B_x & 0
\end{pmatrix}.$$

== See also ==
- Duality (mathematics)
- Dual space § Bilinear products and dual spaces
- Einstein notation
- Flat (music) and Sharp (music) about the signs ♭ and ♯
- Hodge star operator
- Metric tensor
- Vector bundle
