= Kronecker delta =

Mathematical function of two variables; outputs 1 if they are equal, 0 otherwise

In mathematics, the Kronecker delta (named after Leopold Kronecker), is a function of two variables, usually non-negative integers. The function is 1 if the variables are equal, and 0 otherwise:
$$\delta_{ij} = \begin{cases}
0 &\text{if } i \neq j,   \\
1 &\text{if } i=j.   \end{cases}$$
or with use of Iverson brackets:
$$\delta_{ij} = [i=j]\,$$
For example, $\delta_{12} = 0$ because $1 \ne 2$, whereas $\delta_{33} = 1$ because $3 = 3$.

The Kronecker delta appears naturally in many areas of mathematics, physics, engineering and computer science, as a means of compactly expressing its definition above. Generalized versions of the Kronecker delta have found applications in differential geometry and modern tensor calculus, particularly in formulations of gauge theory and topological field models.

In linear algebra, the $n\times n$ identity matrix $\mathbf{I}$ has entries equal to the Kronecker delta:
$$I_{ij} = \delta_{ij}$$
where $i$ and $j$ take the values $1,2,\cdots,n$, and the inner product of vectors can be written as
$$\mathbf{a}\cdot\mathbf{b} = \sum_{i,j=1}^n a_{i}\delta_{ij}b_{j} = \sum_{i=1}^n a_{i} b_{i}.$$
Here the Euclidean vectors are defined as n-tuples: $\mathbf{a} = (a_1, a_2, \dots, a_n)$ and $\mathbf{b}= (b_1, b_2, ..., b_n)$ and the last step is obtained by using the values of the Kronecker delta to reduce the summation over $j$.

It is common for i and j to be restricted to a set of the form {1, 2, ..., n} or {0, 1, ..., n − 1}, but the Kronecker delta can be defined on an arbitrary set.

== Properties ==
The following equations are satisfied:
$$\begin{align}
\sum_{j} \delta_{ij} a_j &= a_i,\\
\sum_{i} a_i \delta_{ij} &= a_j,\\
\sum_{k} \delta_{ik}\delta_{kj} &= \delta_{ij}.
\end{align}$$
Therefore, the matrix δ can be considered as an identity matrix, and is sometimes referred to as the substitution matrix in tensor mathematics.

Another useful representation is the following form:
$$\delta_{nm} = \lim_{N\to\infty}\frac{1}{N} \sum_{k = 1}^N e^{2 \pi i \frac{k}{N}(n-m)}$$
This can be derived using the formula for the geometric series.

== Alternative notation ==
Using the Iverson bracket:
$$\delta_{ij} = [i=j ].$$

Often, a single-argument notation $\delta_i$ is used, which is equivalent to setting $j=0$:
$$\delta_{i} = \delta_{i0} = \begin{cases}
0, & \text{if } i \neq 0  \\
1, & \text{if } i = 0
\end{cases}$$

In linear algebra, it can be thought of as a tensor, and is written $\delta_j^i$. Sometimes the Kronecker delta is called the substitution tensor.

When juxtaposition creates ambiguity, often a comma is employed. For example, a comma separates two integers in $\delta_{19,20}$.

== Digital signal processing ==
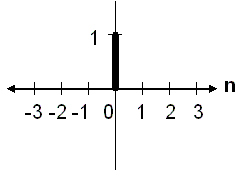
Unit sample function

In the study of digital signal processing (DSP), the Kronecker delta function sometimes means the unit sample function $\delta[n]$ , which represents a special case of the 2-dimensional Kronecker delta function $\delta_{ij}$ where the Kronecker indices include the number zero, and where one of the indices is zero:
$$\delta[n] \equiv \delta_{n0} \equiv \delta_{0n}~~~\text{where} -\infty<n<\infty$$

Or more generally where:
$$\delta[n-k] \equiv \delta[k-n] \equiv \delta_{nk} \equiv \delta_{kn}\text{where} -\infty<n<\infty, -\infty<k<\infty$$

For discrete-time signals, it is conventional to place a single integer index in square braces; in contrast the Kronecker delta, $\delta_{ij}$, can have any number of indexes. In LTI system theory, the discrete unit sample function is typically used as an input to a discrete-time system for determining the impulse response function of the system which characterizes the system for any general input. In contrast, the typical purpose of the Kronecker delta function is for filtering terms from an Einstein summation convention.

The discrete unit sample function is more simply defined as:
$$\delta[n] = \begin{cases} 1 & n = 0 \\ 0 & n \text{ is another integer}\end{cases}$$

In comparison, in continuous-time systems the Dirac delta function is often confused for both the Kronecker delta function and the unit sample function. The Dirac delta is defined as:
$$\begin{cases} \int_{-\varepsilon}^{+\varepsilon}\delta(t)dt = 1 & \forall \varepsilon > 0 \\ \delta(t) = 0 & \forall t \neq 0\end{cases}$$

Unlike the Kronecker delta function $\delta_{ij}$ and the unit sample function $\delta[n]$, the Dirac delta function $\delta(t)$ does not have an integer index, it has a single continuous non-integer value t.

In continuous-time systems, the term "unit impulse function" is used to refer to the Dirac delta function $\delta(t)$ or, in discrete-time systems, the Kronecker delta function $\delta[n]$.

== Notable properties ==
The Kronecker delta has the so-called sifting property that for $j\in\mathbb{Z}$:
$$\sum_{i=-\infty}^\infty a_i \delta_{ij} = a_j.$$
and if the integers are viewed as a measure space, endowed with the counting measure, then this property coincides with the defining property of the Dirac delta function
$$\int_{-\infty}^\infty \delta(x-y)f(x)\, dx=f(y),$$
and in fact Dirac's delta was named after the Kronecker delta because of this analogous property. In signal processing it is usually the context (discrete or continuous time) that distinguishes the Kronecker and Dirac "functions". And by convention, $\delta(t)$ generally indicates continuous time (Dirac), whereas arguments like $i$, $j$, $k$, $l$, $m$, and $n$ are usually reserved for discrete time (Kronecker). Another common practice is to represent discrete sequences with square brackets; thus: $\delta[n]$. The Kronecker delta is not the result of directly sampling the Dirac delta function.

The Kronecker delta forms the multiplicative identity element of an incidence algebra.

The Kronecker delta is an elementary recursive function.

== Relationship to the Dirac delta function ==
In probability theory and statistics, the Kronecker delta and Dirac delta function can both be used to represent a discrete distribution. If the support of a distribution consists of points $\mathbf{x} = \{x_1,\cdots,x_n\}$, with corresponding probabilities $p_1,\cdots,p_n$, then the probability mass function $p(x)$ of the distribution over $\mathbf{x}$ can be written, using the Kronecker delta, as
$$p(x) = \sum_{i=1}^n p_i \delta_{x x_i}.$$

Equivalently, the probability density function $f(x)$ of the distribution can be written using the Dirac delta function as
$$f(x) = \sum_{i=1}^n p_i \delta(x-x_i).$$

Under certain conditions, the Kronecker delta can arise from sampling a Dirac delta function. For example, if a Dirac delta impulse occurs exactly at a sampling point and is ideally lowpass-filtered (with cutoff at the critical frequency) per the Nyquist–Shannon sampling theorem, the resulting discrete-time signal will be a Kronecker delta function.

== Generalizations ==
If it is considered as a type $(1,1)$ tensor, the Kronecker tensor can be written $\delta^i_j$ with a covariant index $j$ and contravariant index $i$:
$$\delta^{i}_{j} = \begin{cases} 0 & (i \ne j), \\ 1 & (i = j). \end{cases}$$

This tensor represents:

- The identity mapping (or identity matrix), considered as a linear mapping $V\to V$ or $V^*\to V^*$
- The trace or tensor contraction, considered as a mapping $V^* \otimes V\to K$
- The map $K\to V^*\otimes V$, representing scalar multiplication as a sum of outer products.

The generalized Kronecker delta or multi-index Kronecker delta of order $2p$ is a type $(p,p)$ tensor that is completely antisymmetric in its $p$ upper indices, and also in its $p$ lower indices.

Two definitions that differ by a factor of $p!$ are in use. Below, the version is presented has nonzero components scaled to be $\pm 1$. The second version has nonzero components that are $\pm 1/p!$, with consequent changes scaling factors in formulae, such as the scaling factors of $1/p!$ in § Properties of the generalized Kronecker delta below disappearing.

=== Definitions of the generalized Kronecker delta ===
In terms of the indices, the generalized Kronecker delta is defined as:
$$\delta^{\mu_1 \dots \mu_p }_{\nu_1 \dots \nu_p} = \begin{cases}
\phantom-1 & \quad \text{if } \nu_1 \dots \nu_p \text{ are distinct integers and are an even permutation of } \mu_1 \dots \mu_p \\
-1 & \quad \text{if } \nu_1 \dots \nu_p \text{ are distinct integers and are an odd permutation of } \mu_1 \dots \mu_p \\
\phantom-0 & \quad \text{in all other cases}.
\end{cases}$$

Let $\mathrm{S}_p$ be the symmetric group of degree $p$, then:
$$\delta^{\mu_1 \dots \mu_p}_{\nu_1 \dots \nu_p}
= \sum_{\sigma \in \mathrm{S}_p} \sgn(\sigma)\, \delta^{\mu_1}_{\nu_{\sigma(1)}}\cdots\delta^{\mu_p}_{\nu_{\sigma(p)}}
= \sum_{\sigma \in \mathrm{S}_p} \sgn(\sigma)\, \delta^{\mu_{\sigma(1)}}_{\nu_1}\cdots\delta^{\mu_{\sigma(p)}}_{\nu_p}.$$

Using anti-symmetrization:
$$\delta^{\mu_1 \dots \mu_p}_{\nu_1 \dots \nu_p}
= p! \delta^{\mu_1}_{[ \nu_1} \dots \delta^{\mu_p}_{\nu_p ]}
= p! \delta^{[ \mu_1}_{\nu_1} \dots \delta^{\mu_p ]}_{\nu_p}.$$

In terms of a $p\times p$ determinant:
$$\delta^{\mu_1 \dots \mu_p }_{\nu_1 \dots \nu_p} =
\begin{vmatrix}
\delta^{\mu_1}_{\nu_1} & \cdots & \delta^{\mu_1}_{\nu_p} \\
\vdots & \ddots & \vdots \\
\delta^{\mu_p}_{\nu_1} & \cdots & \delta^{\mu_p}_{\nu_p}
\end{vmatrix}.$$

Using the Laplace expansion (Laplace's formula) of determinant, it may be defined recursively:
$$\begin{align}
\delta^{\mu_1 \dots \mu_p}_{\nu_1 \dots \nu_p}
&= \sum_{k=1}^p (-1)^{p+k} \delta^{\mu_p}_{\nu_k} \delta^{\mu_1 \dots \mu_{k} \dots \check\mu_p}_{\nu_1 \dots \check\nu_k \dots \nu_p} \\
&= \delta^{\mu_p}_{\nu_p} \delta^{\mu_1 \dots \mu_{p - 1}}_{\nu_1 \dots \nu_{p-1}} - \sum_{k=1}^{p-1} \delta^{\mu_p}_{\nu_k} \delta^{\mu_1 \dots \mu_{k-1}\, \mu_k\, \mu_{k+1} \dots \mu_{p-1}}_{\nu_1 \dots \nu_{k-1}\, \nu_p\, \nu_{k+1} \dots \nu_{p-1}},
\end{align}$$
where the caron, $\check{}$, indicates an index that is omitted from the sequence.

When $p=n$ (the dimension of the vector space), in terms of the Levi-Civita symbol:
$$\delta^{\mu_1 \dots \mu_n}_{\nu_1 \dots \nu_n} = \varepsilon^{\mu_1 \dots \mu_n}\varepsilon_{\nu_1 \dots \nu_n}\,.$$
More generally, for $m=n-p$, using the Einstein summation convention:
$$\delta^{\mu_1 \dots \mu_p}_{\nu_1 \dots \nu_p} = \tfrac{1}{m!} \varepsilon^{\kappa_1 \dots \kappa_m \mu_1 \dots \mu_p}\varepsilon_{\kappa_1 \dots \kappa_m \nu_1 \dots \nu_p}\,.$$

=== Contractions of the generalized Kronecker delta ===
Kronecker Delta contractions depend on the dimension of the space. For example,
$$\delta^{\nu_1}_{\mu_1} \delta^{\mu_1 \mu_2}_{\nu_1 \nu_2} = (d-1) \delta^{\mu_2}_{\nu_2} ,$$
where d is the dimension of the space. From this relation the full contracted delta is obtained as
$$\delta^{\nu_1 \nu_2}_{\mu_1 \mu_2} \delta^{\mu_1 \mu_2}_{\nu_1 \nu_2} = 2d(d-1) .$$
The generalization of the preceding formulas is
$$\delta^{\nu_1 \dots \nu_n}_{\mu_1 \dots \mu_n} \delta^{\mu_1 \dots \mu_p}_{\nu_1 \dots \nu_p} = n! \frac{(d-p+n)!}{(d-p)!} \delta^{\mu_{n+1} \dots \mu_p}_{\nu_{n+1} \dots \nu_p} .$$

=== Properties of the generalized Kronecker delta ===
The generalized Kronecker delta may be used for anti-symmetrization:
$$\begin{align}
\frac{1}{p!} \delta^{\mu_1 \dots \mu_p}_{\nu_1 \dots \nu_p} a^{\nu_1 \dots \nu_p} &= a^{[ \mu_1 \dots \mu_p ]} , \\
\frac{1}{p!} \delta^{\mu_1 \dots \mu_p}_{\nu_1 \dots \nu_p} a_{\mu_1 \dots \mu_p} &= a_{[ \nu_1 \dots \nu_p ]} . \end{align}$$

From the above equations and the properties of anti-symmetric tensors, we can derive the properties of the generalized Kronecker delta:
$$\begin{align}
\frac{1}{p!} \delta^{\mu_1 \dots \mu_p}_{\nu_1 \dots \nu_p} a^{[ \nu_1 \dots \nu_p ]} &= a^{[ \mu_1 \dots \mu_p ]} , \\
\frac{1}{p!} \delta^{\mu_1 \dots \mu_p}_{\nu_1 \dots \nu_p} a_{[ \mu_1 \dots \mu_p ]} &= a_{[ \nu_1 \dots \nu_p ]} , \\
\frac{1}{p!} \delta^{\mu_1 \dots \mu_p}_{\nu_1 \dots \nu_p} \delta^{\nu_1 \dots \nu_p}_{\kappa_1 \dots \kappa_p} &= \delta^{\mu_1 \dots \mu_p}_{\kappa_1 \dots \kappa_p} ,
\end{align}$$
which are the generalized version of formulae written in § Properties. The last formula is equivalent to the Cauchy–Binet formula.

Reducing the order via summation of the indices may be expressed by the identity
$$\delta^{\mu_1 \dots \mu_s \, \mu_{s+1} \dots \mu_p}_{\nu_1 \dots \nu_s \, \mu_{s+1} \dots \mu_p} = \frac{(n-s)!}{(n-p)!} \delta^{\mu_1 \dots \mu_s}_{\nu_1 \dots \nu_s}.$$

Using both the summation rule for the case $p=n$ and the relation with the Levi-Civita symbol, the summation rule of the Levi-Civita symbol is derived:
$$\delta^{\mu_1 \dots \mu_p}_{\nu_1 \dots \nu_p} = \frac{1}{(n-p)!}\varepsilon^{\mu_1 \dots \mu_p \, \kappa_{p+1} \dots \kappa_n}\varepsilon_{\nu_1 \dots \nu_p \, \kappa_{p+1} \dots \kappa_n}.$$
The 4D version of the last relation appears in Penrose's spinor approach to general relativity that he later generalized, while he was developing Aitken's diagrams, to become part of the technique of Penrose graphical notation. Also, this relation is extensively used in S-duality theories, especially when written in the language of differential forms and Hodge duals.

== Integral representations ==
For any integers $j$ and $k$, the Kronecker delta can be written as a complex contour integral using a standard residue calculation. The integral is taken over the unit circle in the complex plane, oriented counterclockwise. An equivalent representation of the integral arises by parameterizing the contour by an angle around the origin.
$$\delta_{jk} = \frac1{2\pi i} \oint_{|z|=1} z^{j-k-1} \,dz=\frac1{2\pi} \int_0^{2\pi} e^{i(j-k)\varphi} \,d\varphi$$

== Kronecker comb ==
The Kronecker comb function with period $N$ is defined (using DSP notation) as:
$$\Delta_N[n]=\sum_{k=-\infty}^\infty \delta[n-kN],$$
where $N\ne 0$, $k$ and $n$ are integers. The Kronecker comb thus consists of an infinite series of unit impulses that are N units apart, aligned so one of the impulses occurs at zero. It may be considered to be the discrete analog of the Dirac comb.

== See also ==
- Dirac measure
- Heaviside step function
- Indicator function
- Levi-Civita symbol
- Minkowski metric
- 't Hooft symbol
- Unit function
- XNOR gate
