= Multilinear multiplication =

In multilinear algebra, applying a map that is the tensor product of linear maps to a tensor is called a multilinear multiplication.

== Abstract definition ==
Let $F$ be a field of characteristic zero, such as $\mathbb{R}$ or $\mathbb{C}$. Let $V_k$ be a finite-dimensional vector space over $F$, and let $\mathcal{A} \in V_1 \otimes V_2 \otimes \cdots \otimes V_d$ be an order-d simple tensor, i.e., there exist some vectors $\mathbf{v}_k \in V_k$ such that $\mathcal{A} = \mathbf{v}_1 \otimes \mathbf{v}_2 \otimes \cdots \otimes \mathbf{v}_d$. If we are given a collection of linear maps $A_k : V_k \to W_k$, then the multilinear multiplication of $\mathcal{A}$ with $(A_1, A_2, \ldots, A_d)$ is defined as the action on $\mathcal{A}$ of the tensor product of these linear maps, namely

$$\begin{align}
A_1 \otimes A_2 \otimes \cdots \otimes A_d : V_1 \otimes V_2 \otimes \cdots \otimes V_d & \to W_1 \otimes W_2 \otimes \cdots \otimes W_d, \\
\mathbf{v}_1 \otimes \mathbf{v}_2 \otimes \cdots \otimes \mathbf{v}_d & \mapsto A_1(\mathbf{v}_1) \otimes A_2(\mathbf{v}_2) \otimes \cdots \otimes A_d(\mathbf{v}_d)
\end{align}$$

Since the tensor product of linear maps is itself a linear map, and because every tensor admits a tensor rank decomposition, the above expression extends linearly to all tensors. That is, for a general tensor $\mathcal{A} \in V_1 \otimes V_2 \otimes \cdots \otimes V_d$, the multilinear multiplication is

$$\begin{align}
& \mathcal{B} := (A_1 \otimes A_2 \otimes \cdots \otimes A_d)(\mathcal{A}) \\[4pt]
= {} & (A_1 \otimes A_2 \otimes \cdots \otimes A_d)\left(\sum_{i=1}^r \mathbf{a}_i^1 \otimes \mathbf{a}_i^2 \otimes \cdots \otimes \mathbf{a}_i^d\right) \\[5pt]
= {} & \sum_{i=1}^r A_1(\mathbf{a}_i^1) \otimes A_2(\mathbf{a}_i^2) \otimes \cdots \otimes A_d( \mathbf{a}_i^d )
\end{align}$$

where $\mathcal{A} = \sum_{i=1}^r \mathbf{a}_i^1 \otimes \mathbf{a}_i^2 \otimes \cdots \otimes \mathbf{a}_i^d$ with $\mathbf{a}_i^k \in V_k$ is one of $\mathcal{A}$'s tensor rank decompositions. The validity of the above expression is not limited to a tensor rank decomposition; in fact, it is valid for any expression of $\mathcal{A}$ as a linear combination of pure tensors, which follows from the universal property of the tensor product.

It is standard to use the following shorthand notations in the literature for multilinear multiplications:
$$(A_1, A_2, \ldots, A_d) \cdot \mathcal{A} := (A_1 \otimes A_2 \otimes \cdots \otimes A_d)(\mathcal{A})$$
and
$$A_k \cdot_k \mathcal{A} := (\operatorname{Id}_{V_1}, \ldots, \operatorname{Id}_{V_{k-1}}, A_k, \operatorname{Id}_{V_{k+1}}, \ldots, \operatorname{Id}_{V_{d}}) \cdot \mathcal{A},$$
where $\operatorname{Id}_{V_k} : V_k \to V_k$ is the identity operator.

== Definition in coordinates ==
In computational multilinear algebra it is conventional to work in coordinates. Assume that an inner product is fixed on $V_k$ and let $V_k^*$ denote the dual vector space of $V_k$. Let $\{ e_1^k, \ldots, e_{n_k}^k \}$ be a basis for $V_k$, let $\{ (e_1^k)^*, \ldots, (e_{n_k}^k)^* \}$ be the dual basis, and let $\{f_1^k, \ldots, f_{m_k}^k \}$ be a basis for $W_k$. The linear map $M_k = \sum_{i=1}^{m_k} \sum_{j=1}^{n_k} m_{i,j}^{(k)} f_i^k \otimes (e_j^k)^*$ is then represented by the matrix $\widehat{M}_k = [m_{i,j}^{(k)}] \in F^{m_k \times n_k}$. Likewise, with respect to the standard tensor product basis $\{ e_{j_1}^1 \otimes e_{j_2}^2 \otimes \cdots \otimes e_{j_d}^d \}_{j_1,j_2,\ldots,j_d}$, the abstract tensor
$$\mathcal{A} = \sum_{j_1=1}^{n_1} \sum_{j_2=1}^{n_2} \cdots \sum_{j_d=1}^{n_d} a_{j_1,j_2,\ldots,j_d} e_{j_1}^1 \otimes e_{j_2}^2 \otimes \cdots \otimes e_{j_d}^d$$
is represented by the multidimensional array $\widehat{\mathcal{A}} = [a_{j_1,j_2,\ldots,j_d}] \in F^{n_1 \times n_2 \times \cdots \times n_d}$ . Observe that
$$\widehat{\mathcal{A}} = \sum_{j_1=1}^{n_1} \sum_{j_2=1}^{n_2} \cdots \sum_{j_d=1}^{n_d} a_{j_1,j_2,\ldots,j_d} \mathbf{e}_{j_1}^1 \otimes \mathbf{e}_{j_2}^2 \otimes \cdots \otimes \mathbf{e}_{j_d}^d,$$

where $\mathbf{e}_j^k \in F^{n_k}$ is the jth standard basis vector of $F^{n_k}$ and the tensor product of vectors is the affine Segre map $\otimes : (\mathbf{v}^{(1)}, \mathbf{v}^{(2)}, \ldots, \mathbf{v}^{(d)}) \mapsto [v_{i_1}^{(1)} v_{i_2}^{(2)} \cdots v_{i_d}^{(d)}]_{i_1,i_2,\ldots,i_d}$. It follows from the above choices of bases that the multilinear multiplication $\mathcal{B} = (M_1, M_2, \ldots, M_d) \cdot \mathcal{A}$ becomes

$$\begin{align}
\widehat{\mathcal{B}} &= (\widehat{M}_1, \widehat{M}_2, \ldots, \widehat{M}_d) \cdot \sum_{j_1=1}^{n_1} \sum_{j_2=1}^{n_2} \cdots \sum_{j_d=1}^{n_d} a_{j_1,j_2,\ldots,j_d} \mathbf{e}_{j_1}^1 \otimes \mathbf{e}_{j_2}^2 \otimes \cdots \otimes \mathbf{e}_{j_d}^d \\
&= \sum_{j_1=1}^{n_1} \sum_{j_2=1}^{n_2} \cdots \sum_{j_d=1}^{n_d} a_{j_1,j_2,\ldots,j_d} (\widehat{M}_1, \widehat{M}_2, \ldots, \widehat{M}_d) \cdot (\mathbf{e}_{j_1}^1 \otimes \mathbf{e}_{j_2}^2 \otimes \cdots \otimes \mathbf{e}_{j_d}^d) \\
&= \sum_{j_1=1}^{n_1} \sum_{j_2=1}^{n_2} \cdots \sum_{j_d=1}^{n_d} a_{j_1,j_2,\ldots,j_d} (\widehat{M}_1 \mathbf{e}_{j_1}^1) \otimes (\widehat{M}_2 \mathbf{e}_{j_2}^2) \otimes \cdots \otimes (\widehat{M}_d \mathbf{e}_{j_d}^d).
\end{align}$$

The resulting tensor $\widehat{\mathcal{B}}$ lives in $F^{m_1 \times m_2 \times \cdots \times m_d}$.

=== Element-wise definition ===
From the above expression, an element-wise definition of the multilinear multiplication is obtained. Indeed, since $\widehat{\mathcal{B}}$ is a multidimensional array, it may be expressed as
$$\widehat{\mathcal{B}} = \sum_{j_1=1}^{n_1} \sum_{j_2=1}^{n_2} \cdots \sum_{j_d=1}^{n_d} b_{j_1,j_2,\ldots,j_d} \mathbf{e}_{j_1}^1 \otimes \mathbf{e}_{j_2}^2 \otimes \cdots \otimes \mathbf{e}_{j_d}^d,$$
where $b_{j_1,j_2,\ldots,j_d} \in F$ are the coefficients. Then it follows from the above formulae that

$$\begin{align}
& \left( (\mathbf{e}_{i_1}^1)^T, (\mathbf{e}_{i_2}^2)^T, \ldots, (\mathbf{e}_{i_d}^d)^T \right) \cdot \widehat{\mathcal{B}} \\
= {} & \sum_{j_1=1}^{n_1} \sum_{j_2=1}^{n_2} \cdots \sum_{j_d=1}^{n_d} b_{j_1,j_2,\ldots,j_d} \left( (\mathbf{e}_{i_1}^1)^T \mathbf{e}_{j_1}^1 \right) \otimes \left((\mathbf{e}_{i_2}^2)^T \mathbf{e}_{j_2}^2\right) \otimes \cdots \otimes \left( (\mathbf{e}_{i_d}^d)^T \mathbf{e}_{j_d}^d \right) \\
= {} & \sum_{j_1=1}^{n_1} \sum_{j_2=1}^{n_2} \cdots \sum_{j_d=1}^{n_d} b_{j_1,j_2,\ldots,j_d} \delta_{i_1, j_1} \cdot \delta_{i_2,j_2} \cdots \delta_{i_d, j_d} \\
= {} & b_{i_1,i_2,\ldots,i_d},
\end{align}$$

where $\delta_{i,j}$ is the Kronecker delta. Hence, if $\mathcal{B} = (M_1, M_2, \ldots, M_d) \cdot \mathcal{A}$, then

$$\begin{align}
& b_{i_1,i_2,\ldots,i_d} = \left( (\mathbf{e}_{i_1}^1)^T, (\mathbf{e}_{i_2}^2)^T, \ldots, (\mathbf{e}_{i_d}^d)^T \right) \cdot \widehat{\mathcal{B}} \\
= {} & \left( (\mathbf{e}_{i_1}^1)^T, (\mathbf{e}_{i_2}^2)^T, \ldots, (\mathbf{e}_{i_d}^d)^T \right) \cdot (\widehat{M}_1, \widehat{M}_2, \ldots, \widehat{M}_d) \cdot
\sum_{j_1=1}^{n_1} \sum_{j_2=1}^{n_2} \cdots \sum_{j_d=1}^{n_d} a_{j_1,j_2,\ldots,j_d} \mathbf{e}_{j_1}^1 \otimes \mathbf{e}_{j_2}^2 \otimes \cdots \otimes \mathbf{e}_{j_d}^d \\
= {} & \sum_{j_1=1}^{n_1} \sum_{j_2=1}^{n_2} \cdots \sum_{j_d=1}^{n_d} a_{j_1,j_2,\ldots,j_d} ((\mathbf{e}_{i_1}^1)^T \widehat{M}_1 \mathbf{e}_{j_1}^1) \otimes ((\mathbf{e}_{i_2}^2)^T \widehat{M}_2 \mathbf{e}_{j_2}^2) \otimes \cdots \otimes ((\mathbf{e}_{i_d}^d)^T \widehat{M}_d \mathbf{e}_{j_d}^d) \\
= {} & \sum_{j_1=1}^{n_1} \sum_{j_2=1}^{n_2} \cdots \sum_{j_d=1}^{n_d} a_{j_1,j_2,\ldots,j_d} m_{i_1,j_1}^{(1)} \cdot m_{i_2,j_2}^{(2)} \cdots m_{i_d,j_d}^{(d)},
\end{align}$$

where the $m_{i,j}^{(k)}$ are the elements of $\widehat{M}_k$ as defined above.

== Properties ==
Let $\mathcal{A} \in V_1 \otimes V_2 \otimes \cdots \otimes V_d$ be an order-d tensor over the tensor product of $F$-vector spaces.

Since a multilinear multiplication is the tensor product of linear maps, we have the following multilinearity property (in the construction of the map):

$$A_1 \otimes \cdots \otimes A_{k-1} \otimes (\alpha A_k + \beta B) \otimes A_{k+1} \otimes \cdots \otimes A_d =
\alpha A_1 \otimes \cdots \otimes A_d + \beta A_1 \otimes \cdots \otimes A_{k-1} \otimes B \otimes A_{k+1} \otimes \cdots \otimes A_d$$

Multilinear multiplication is a linear map:
$$(M_1, M_2, \ldots, M_d) \cdot (\alpha \mathcal{A} + \beta \mathcal{B})
= \alpha \; (M_1, M_2, \ldots, M_d) \cdot \mathcal{A} +
\beta \; (M_1, M_2, \ldots, M_d) \cdot \mathcal{B}$$

It follows from the definition that the composition of two multilinear multiplications is also a multilinear multiplication:

$$(M_1, M_2, \ldots, M_d) \cdot \left( (K_1, K_2, \ldots, K_d) \cdot \mathcal{A} \right)
= (M_1 \circ K_1, M_2 \circ K_2, \ldots, M_d \circ K_d) \cdot \mathcal{A},$$

where $M_k : U_k \to W_k$ and $K_k : V_k \to U_k$ are linear maps.

Observe specifically that multilinear multiplications in different factors commute,

$$M_k \cdot_k \left( M_\ell \cdot_\ell \mathcal{A} \right)
= M_\ell \cdot_\ell \left( M_k \cdot_k \mathcal{A} \right)
= M_k \cdot_k M_\ell \cdot_\ell \mathcal{A},$$

if $k \ne \ell.$

== Computation ==
The factor-k multilinear multiplication $M_k \cdot_k\mathcal{A}$ can be computed in coordinates as follows. Observe first that

$$\begin{align}
M_k \cdot_k \mathcal{A} &= M_k \cdot_k
\sum_{j_1=1}^{n_1} \sum_{j_2=1}^{n_2} \cdots \sum_{j_d=1}^{n_d} a_{j_1,j_2,\ldots,j_d} \mathbf{e}_{j_1}^1 \otimes \mathbf{e}_{j_2}^2 \otimes \cdots \otimes \mathbf{e}_{j_d}^d \\
&= \sum_{j_1=1}^{n_1} \cdots \sum_{j_{k-1}=1}^{n_{k-1}} \sum_{j_{k+1}=1}^{n_{k+1}} \cdots \sum_{j_d=1}^{n_d} \mathbf{e}_{j_1}^1 \otimes \cdots \otimes \mathbf{e}_{j_{k-1}}^{k-1} \otimes M_k \left ( \sum_{j_k=1}^{n_k} a_{j_1,j_2,\ldots,j_d} \mathbf{e}_{j_k}^k \right) \otimes \mathbf{e}_{j_{k+1}}^{k+1} \otimes \cdots \otimes \mathbf{e}_{j_d}^d.
\end{align}$$

Next, since

$$F^{n_1} \otimes F^{n_2} \otimes \cdots \otimes F^{n_d}
\simeq F^{n_k} \otimes (F^{n_1} \otimes \cdots \otimes F^{n_{k-1}} \otimes F^{n_{k+1}} \otimes \cdots \otimes F^{n_d})
\simeq F^{n_k} \otimes F^{n_1 \cdots n_{k-1} n_{k+1} \cdots n_d},$$

there is a bijective map, called the factor-k standard flattening, denoted by $(\cdot)_{(k)}$, that identifies $M_k \cdot_k \mathcal{A}$ with an element from the latter space, namely

$$\left( M_k \cdot_k \mathcal{A} \right)_{(k)} :=
\sum_{j_1=1}^{n_1} \cdots \sum_{j_{k-1}=1}^{n_{k-1}} \sum_{j_{k+1}=1}^{n_{k+1}} \cdots \sum_{j_d=1}^{n_d} M_k \left ( \sum_{j_k=1}^{n_k} a_{j_1,j_2,\ldots,j_d} \mathbf{e}_{j_{k}}^{k} \right) \otimes \mathbf{e}_{\mu_k(j_1,\ldots,j_{k-1},j_{k+1},\ldots,j_d)} := M_k \mathcal{A}_{(k)},$$

where $\mathbf{e}_j$is the jth standard basis vector of $F^{N_k}$, $N_k = n_1 \cdots n_{k-1} n_{k+1} \cdots n_d$, and $\mathcal{A}_{(k)} \in F^{n_k} \otimes F^{N_k} \simeq F^{n_k \times N_k}$ is the factor-k flattening matrix of $\mathcal{A}$ whose columns are the factor-k vectors $[a_{j_1,\ldots,j_{k-1},i,j_{k+1},\ldots,j_d}]_{i=1}^{n_k}$ in some order, determined by the particular choice of the bijective map

$$\mu_k : [1,n_1] \times \cdots \times [1,n_{k-1}] \times [1,n_{k+1}] \times \cdots \times [1,n_d] \to [1,N_k].$$

In other words, the multilinear multiplication $(M_1, M_2, \ldots, M_d) \cdot \mathcal{A}$ can be computed as a sequence of d factor-k multilinear multiplications, which themselves can be implemented efficiently as classic matrix multiplications.

== Applications ==
The higher-order singular value decomposition (HOSVD) factorizes a tensor given in coordinates $\mathcal{A} \in F^{n_1 \times n_2 \times \cdots \times n_d}$ as the multilinear multiplication $\mathcal{A} = (U_1, U_2, \ldots, U_d) \cdot \mathcal{S}$, where $U_k \in F^{n_k \times n_k}$ are orthogonal matrices and $\mathcal{S} \in F^{n_1 \times n_2 \times \cdots \times n_d}$.
