= Tensor software =

Class of mathematical software

Tensor software is a class of mathematical software designed for manipulation and calculation with tensors.

== Standalone software ==
- SPLATT is an open source software package for high-performance sparse tensor factorization. SPLATT ships a stand-alone executable, C/C++ library, and Octave/MATLAB API.
- Cadabra is a computer algebra system (CAS) designed specifically for the solution of problems encountered in field theory. It has extensive functionality for tensor polynomial simplification including multi-term symmetries, fermions and anti-commuting variables, Clifford algebras and Fierz transformations, implicit coordinate dependence, multiple index types and many more. The input format is a subset of TeX. Both a command-line and a graphical interface are available.
- Tela is a software package similar to MATLAB and GNU Octave, but designed specifically for tensors.

== Software for use with Mathematica ==
- Tensor is a tensor package written for the Mathematica system. It provides many functions relevant for General Relativity calculations in general Riemann–Cartan geometries.
- Ricci is a system for Mathematica 2.x and later for doing basic tensor analysis, available for free.
- TTC Tools of Tensor Calculus is a Mathematica package for doing tensor and exterior calculus on differentiable manifolds.
- EDC and RGTC, "Exterior Differential Calculus" and "Riemannian Geometry & Tensor Calculus," are free Mathematica packages for tensor calculus especially designed but not only for general relativity.
- Tensorial "Tensorial 4.0" is a general purpose tensor calculus package for Mathematica.
- xAct: Efficient Tensor Computer Algebra for Mathematica. xAct is a collection of packages for fast manipulation of symbolic tensor expressions.
- GREAT is a free package for Mathematica that computes the Christoffel connection and the basic tensors of General Relativity from a given metric tensor.
- Atlas 2 for Mathematica is a powerful Mathematica toolbox which allows to do a wide range of modern differential geometry calculations
- GRTensorM is a computer algebra package for performing calculations in the general area of differential geometry.
- MathGR is a package to manipulate tensor and GR calculations with either abstract or explicit indices, simplify tensors with permutational symmetries, decompose tensors from abstract indices to partially or completely explicit indices and convert partial derivatives into total derivatives.
- TensoriaCalc is a tensor calculus package written for Mathematica 9 and higher, aimed at providing user-friendly functionality and a smooth consistency with the Mathematica language itself. As of December 2025, given a metric and its coordinates, TensoriaCalc can compute the associated geometric objects such as Christoffel symbols, Riemann curvature tensor, Ricci tensor/scalar, etc. It allows for generic tensors to be defined and their indices moved readily. Furthermore, it is able to carry out differential geometric operations such as covariant, Lie and exterior derivatives; Hodge duals; coordinate transformations on generic tensors, including the use of orthonormal basis; etc. TensoriaCalc is continuously under development.
- OGRe is a modern free and open-source Mathematica package for tensor calculus, released in 2021 for Mathematica 12.0 and later. It is designed to be both powerful and user-friendly, and is especially suitable for general relativity. OGRe allows performing arbitrarily complicated tensor operations, and automatically transforms between index configurations and coordinate systems behind the scenes as needed for each operation.

== Software for use with Maple ==
- GRTensorII is a computer algebra package for performing calculations in the general area of differential geometry.
- Atlas 2 for Maple is a modern differential geometry for Maple.
- DifferentialGeometry is a package which performs fundamental operations of calculus on manifolds, differential geometry, tensor calculus, General Relativity, Lie algebras, Lie groups, transformation groups, jet spaces, and the variational calculus. It is included with Maple.
- Physics is a package developed as part of Maple, which implements symbolic computations with most of the objects used in mathematical physics. It includes objects from general relativity (tensors, metrics, covariant derivatives, tetrads etc.), quantum mechanics (Kets, Bras, commutators, noncommutative variables) etc.

== Software for use with Matlab ==
- Tensorlab is a MATLAB toolbox for multilinear algebra and structured data fusion.
- Tensor Toolbox Multilinear algebra MATLAB software.
- MPCA and MPCA+LDA Multilinear subspace learning software: Multilinear principal component analysis.
- UMPCA Multilinear subspace learning software: Uncorrelated multilinear principal component analysis.
- UMLDA Multilinear subspace learning software: Uncorrelated multilinear discriminant analysis.

== Software for use with Maxima ==
Maxima is a free open source general purpose computer algebra system which includes several packages for tensor algebra calculations in its core distribution. It is particularly useful for calculations with abstract tensors, i.e., when one wishes to do calculations without defining all components of the tensor explicitly. It comes with three tensor packages:

- itensor for abstract (indicial) tensor manipulation,
- ctensor for component-defined tensors, and
- atensor for algebraic tensor manipulation.

== Software for use with R ==
- Tensor is an R package for basic tensor operations.
- rTensor provides several tensor decomposition approaches.
- nnTensor provides several non-negative tensor decomposition approaches.
- ttTensor provides several tensor-train decomposition approaches.
- tensorBF is an R package for Bayesian Tensor decomposition.
- MTF Bayesian Multi-Tensor Factorization for data fusion and Bayesian versions of Tensor PCA and Tensor CCA. Software: MTF.
- ricci provides a compact R interface for performing tensor calculations. It makes use of Ricci calculus conventions to implicitly trigger contractions and diagonal subsetting. Explicit tensor operations, such as addition, subtraction and multiplication of tensors via standard arithmetic operators, raising and lowering indices, taking symmetric or antisymmetric tensor parts, as well as the Kronecker product are available. Common tensors like the Kronecker delta, Levi Civita epsilon, certain metric tensors, the Christoffel symbols, the Riemann tensor as well as Ricci tensor are provided. The Covariant derivative of tensor fields with respect to any metric tensor can be evaluated.

== Software for use with Python ==
- TensorLy provides several tensor decomposition approaches.
- OGRePy is Python port of the Mathematica package OGRe (see § Software for use with Mathematica), released in 2024 for Python 3.12 and later. It utilizes SymPy for symbolic computations and Jupyter as a notebook interface. OGRePy allows calculating arbitrary tensor formulas using any combination of addition, multiplication by scalar, trace, contraction, partial derivative, covariant derivative, and permutation of indices, and provides facilities for calculating various curvature tensors and geodesic equations.
- Tensorgrad, an open-source python package for symbolic tensor manipulation. Supports general symbolic tensor derivatives using Penrose graphical notation, and gaussian expectations via Isserlis' theorem.

== Software for use with Julia ==
- TensorDecompositions.jl provides several tensor decomposition approaches.
- TensorToolbox.jl provides several tensor decomposition approaches. This follows the functionality of MATLAB Tensor toolbox and Hierarchical Tucker Toolbox.
- ITensors.jl is a library for rapidly creating correct and efficient tensor network algorithms. This is the Julia version of ITensor, not a wrapper around the C++ version but full implementations by Julia language.

== Software for use with SageMath ==
- SageManifolds: tensor calculus on smooth manifolds; all SageManifolds code is included in SageMath since version 7.5; it allows for computations in various vector frames and coordinate charts, the manifold not being required to be parallelizable.

== Software for use with Java ==
- ND4J: N-dimensional arrays for the JVM is a Java library for basic tensor operations and scientific computing.
- Tensor: computation for regular or unstructured multi-dimensional tensors. Scalar entries are either in numeric or exact precision. API inspired by Mathematica. Java 8 library in with no external dependencies.

== Libraries ==
- Redberry is an open source computer algebra system designed for symbolic tensor manipulation. Redberry provides common tools for expression manipulation, generalized on tensorial objects, as well as tensor-specific features: indices symmetries, LaTeX-style input, natural dummy indices handling, multiple index types etc. The HEP package includes tools for Feynman diagrams calculation: Dirac and SU(N) algebra, Levi-Civita simplifications, tools for calculation of one-loop counterterms etc. Redberry is written in Java and provides extensive Groovy-based programming language.
- libxm is a lightweight distributed-parallel tensor library written in C.
- FTensor is a high performance tensor library written in C++.
- TL is a multi-threaded tensor library implemented in C++ used in Dynare++. The library allows for folded/unfolded, dense/sparse tensor representations, general ranks (symmetries). The library implements Faa Di Bruno formula and is adaptive to available memory. Dynare++ is a standalone package solving higher order Taylor approximations to equilibria of non-linear stochastic models with rational expectations.
- vmmlib is a C++ linear algebra library that supports 3-way tensors, emphasizing computation and manipulation of several tensor decompositions.
- Spartns is a Sparse Tensor framework for Common Lisp.
- FAstMat is a thread-safe general tensor algebra library written in C++ and specially designed for FEM/FVM/BEM/FDM element/edge wise computations.
- Cyclops Tensor Framework is a distributed memory library for efficient decomposition of tensors of arbitrary type and parallel MPI+OpenMP execution of tensor contractions/functions.
- TiledArray is a scalable, block-sparse tensor library that is designed to aid in rapid composition of high-performance algebraic tensor equation. It is designed to scale from a single multicore computer to a massively-parallel, distributed-memory system.
- libtensor is a set of performance linear tensor algebra routines for large tensors found in post-Hartree–Fock methods in quantum chemistry.
- ITensor features automatic contraction of matching tensor indices. It is written in C++ and has higher-level features for quantum physics algorithms based on tensor networks.
- Fastor is a high performance C++ tensor algebra library that supports tensors of any arbitrary dimensions and all their possible contraction and permutation thereof. It employs compile-time graph search optimisations to find the optimal contraction sequence between arbitrary number of tensors in a network. It has high level domain specific features for solving nonlinear multiphysics problem using FEM.
- Xerus is a C++ tensor algebra library for tensors of arbitrary dimensions and tensor decomposition into general tensor networks (focusing on matrix product states). It offers Einstein notation like syntax and optimizes the contraction order of any network of tensors at runtime so that dimensions need not be fixed at compile-time.
