= Frank Hitchcock =

Frank Hitchcock may refer to:

- Frank Harris Hitchcock (1867–1935), American postmaster-general
- Frank Lauren Hitchcock (1875–1957), American mathematician
