= Lieven De Lathauwer =

Belgian engineer

- Education: KU Leuven
- Awards: Fellow of the IEEE. fellow of the Society for Industrial and Applied Mathematics.

Lieven De Lathauwer is a mathematician and engineer working in numerical linear algebra and specializing in the study of tensor decompositions.

He received a PhD in engineering from KU Leuven in 1997.

He was named Fellow of the Institute of Electrical and Electronics Engineers (IEEE) in 2015 for contributions to signal processing algorithms using tensor decompositions. He was elected as a fellow of the Society for Industrial and Applied Mathematics in 2017, "for fundamental contributions to theory, computation, and application of tensor decompositions".
