= Lauren B. Hitchcock =

Chemical engineer

Lauren Blakely Hitchcock
- Born: March 18, 1900; Paris, France
- Died: October 15, 1972 (aged 72)
- Education: Massachusetts Institute of Technology (BS, MS, PhD)
- Known for: Air pollution research and advocacy
- Scientific career
- Fields: Chemical engineering, air pollution control
- Workplaces: University at Buffalo, University of Virginia, Air Pollution Foundation of Los Angeles

Lauren Blakely Hitchcock (March 18, 1900 – October 15, 1972) was a chemical engineer and early opponent of air pollution.

Hitchcock was born in Paris to Frank Lauren Hitchcock, a mathematician and physicist, and Margaret Johnson Blakely, and was raised in Belmont, Massachusetts. He received his undergraduate (1920), master's (1927), and doctorate degree (1933) from Massachusetts Institute of Technology. He taught at the University of Virginia from 1928 to 1935 and then moved into private industry.

Hitchcock became president of the Southern California Air Pollution Foundation (APF) in 1954, which had been formed to fight smog. Hitchcock identified automobile exhaust and backyard incinerators as the cause and advised that significant steps would be needed--comparable to wartime efforts--to fight the problem in a meaningful way. In 1963, Hitchcock was appointed to the faculty at University at Buffalo, where his work papers are now archived.
