= Multilinear principal component analysis =

Multilinear extension of principal component analysis

Multilinear principal component analysis (MPCA) is a multilinear extension of principal component analysis (PCA) that is used to analyze M-way arrays, also informally referred to as "data tensors". M-way arrays may be modeled by

- linear tensor models, such as CANDECOMP/Parafac, or by
- multilinear tensor models, such as multilinear principal component analysis (MPCA) or multilinear (tensor) independent component analysis (MICA).

In 2005, Vasilescu and Terzopoulos introduced the Multilinear PCA terminology as a way to better differentiate between multilinear data models that employed 2nd order statistics versus higher order statistics to compute a set of independent components for each mode, such as Multilinear ICA

Multilinear PCA may be applied to compute the causal factors of data formation, or as signal processing tool on data tensors whose individual observation have either been vectorized, or whose observations are treated as a collection of column/row observations, an "observation as a matrix", and concatenated into a data tensor. The latter approach is suitable for compression and reducing redundancy in the rows, columns and fibers that are unrelated to the causal factors of data formation.

Vasilescu and Terzopoulos in their paper "TensorFaces" introduced the M-mode SVD algorithm which are algorithms misidentified in the literature as the HOSVD or the Tucker which employ the power method or gradient descent, respectively.

Vasilescu and Terzopoulos framed the data analysis, recognition and synthesis problems as multilinear tensor problems. Data is viewed as the compositional consequence of several causal factors, that are well suited for multi-modal tensor factor analysis. The power of the tensor framework was showcased by analyzing human motion joint angles, facial images or textures in the following papers: Human Motion Signatures (CVPR 2001, ICPR 2002), face recognition – TensorFaces, (ECCV 2002, CVPR 2003, etc.) and computer graphics – TensorTextures (Siggraph 2004).

== The algorithm ==
The MPCA solution follows the alternating least square (ALS) approach. It is iterative in nature. As in PCA, MPCA works on centered data. Centering is a little more complicated for tensors, and it is problem dependent.

== Feature selection ==
MPCA features: Supervised MPCA is employed in causal factor analysis that facilitates object recognition while a semi-supervised MPCA feature selection is employed in visualization tasks.

== Extensions ==
Various extension of MPCA:

- Robust MPCA (RMPCA)
- Multi-Tensor Factorization, that also finds the number of components automatically (MTF)
