= Ledyard Tucker =

American mathematician

Ledyard R. Tucker
- Born: September 19, 1910; Glenwood Springs, Colorado
- Died: August 16, 2004 (aged 93); Savoy, Illinois
- Education: University of Colorado; University of Chicago
- Known for: Angoff method Tucker decomposition Tucker–Koopman–Linn model
- Scientific career
- Fields: Mathematics
- Workplaces: Educational Testing Service; University of Illinois Urbana-Champaign
- Doctoral advisor: Louis Leon Thurstone

Ledyard Romulus Tucker (19 September 1910 – 16 August 2004) was an American mathematician who specialized in statistics and psychometrics. His Ph.D. advisor at the University of Chicago was Louis Leon Thurstone. He was a lecturer in psychology at Princeton University from 1948 to 1960, while simultaneously working at ETS. In 1960, he moved to working full-time in academia when he joined the University of Illinois Urbana-Champaign. The rest of his career was spent as professor of quantitative psychology and educational psychology at University of Illinois Urbana-Champaign until he retired in 1979. Tucker is best known for his Tucker decomposition and Tucker–Koopman–Linn model. He is credited with the invention of Angoff method.

In 1957 he was elected as a Fellow of the American Statistical Association.

He died at his home in Savoy, Illinois, on August 16, 2004, aged 93.

== Selected publications ==
- Ledyard Tucker (September 1966). "Some mathematical notes on three-mode factor analysis". Psychometrika. 31 (3): 279–311. doi:10.1007/BF02289464. PMID 5221127. S2CID 44301099.
