= Neural Computation (journal) =

- Discipline: Neural computation
- Language: English
- Edited by: Terrence J. Sejnowski

Publication details
- History: 1989–present
- Publisher: MIT Press
- Frequency: Monthly
- Open access: Hybrid
- Impact factor: 3.278 (2021)

Standard abbreviations
- ISO 4: Neural Comput.

Indexing
- ISSN: 0899-7667 (print); 1530-888X (web)
- OCLC no.: 39265996

Links
- Journal homepage; Online access

Neural Computation is a monthly peer-reviewed scientific journal covering all aspects of neural computation, including modeling the brain and the design and construction of neurally-inspired information processing systems. It was established in 1989 and is published by MIT Press. The editor-in-chief is Terrence J. Sejnowski (Salk Institute for Biological Studies).

According to the Journal Citation Reports, the journal has a 2021 impact factor of 3.278.
