= Tensor reshaping =

In multilinear algebra, a reshaping of tensors is any bijection between the set of indices of an order-$M$ tensor and the set of indices of an order-$L$ tensor, where $L < M$. The use of indices presupposes tensors in coordinate representation with respect to a basis. The coordinate representation of a tensor can be regarded as a multi-dimensional array, and a bijection from one set of indices to another therefore amounts to a rearrangement of the array elements into an array of a different shape. Such a rearrangement constitutes a particular kind of linear map between the vector space of order-$M$ tensors and the vector space of order-$L$ tensors.

== Definition ==
Given a positive integer $M$, the notation $[M]$ refers to the set $\{1, \dots, M \}$ of the first M positive integers.

For each integer $m$ where $1 \le m \le M$ for a positive integer $M$, let $V_m$ denote an $I_m$-dimensional vector space over a field $F$. Then there are vector space isomorphisms (linear maps)

$$\begin{align}
V_1 \otimes \cdots \otimes V_M
& \simeq F^{I_1} \otimes \cdots \otimes F^{I_M} \\
& \simeq F^{I_{\pi_1}} \otimes \cdots \otimes F^{I_{\pi_M}} \\
& \simeq F^{I_{\pi_1} I_{\pi_2}} \otimes F^{I_{\pi_3}} \otimes \cdots \otimes F^{I_{\pi_M}} \\
& \simeq F^{I_{\pi_1} I_{\pi_3}} \otimes F^{I_{\pi_2}} \otimes F^{I_{\pi_4}} \otimes \cdots \otimes F^{I_{\pi_M}} \\
& \,\,\,\vdots \\
& \simeq F^{I_1 I_2 \ldots I_M},
\end{align}$$

where $\pi \in \mathfrak{S}_M$ is any permutation and $\mathfrak{S}_M$ is the symmetric group on $M$ elements. Via these (and other) vector space isomorphisms, a tensor can be interpreted in several ways as an order-$L$ tensor where $L \le M$.

=== Coordinate representation ===
The first vector space isomorphism on the list above, $V_1 \otimes \cdots \otimes V_M \simeq F^{I_1} \otimes \cdots \otimes F^{I_M}$, gives the coordinate representation of an abstract tensor. Assume that each of the $M$ vector spaces $V_m$ has a basis $\{ v_1^m, v_2^m, \ldots, v_{I_m}^m \}$. The expression of a tensor with respect to this basis has the form $\mathcal{A} = \sum_{i_1=1}^{I_1}\ldots\sum_{i_M=1}^{I_M} a_{i_1,i_2,\ldots,i_M} v_{i_1}^1 \otimes v_{i_2}^2 \otimes \cdots \otimes v_{i_M}^{M},$ where the coefficients $a_{i_1,i_2,\ldots,i_M}$ are elements of $F$. The coordinate representation of $\mathcal{A}$ is $\sum_{i_1=1}^{I_1}\ldots\sum_{i_M=1}^{I_M} a_{i_1,i_2,\ldots,i_M} \mathbf{e}_{i_1}^1 \otimes \mathbf{e}_{i_2}^2 \otimes \cdots \otimes \mathbf{e}_{i_M}^M,$where $\mathbf{e}_{i}^m$ is the $i^\text{th}$ standard basis vector of $F^{I_m}$. This can be regarded as a M-way array whose elements are the coefficients $a_{i_1,i_2,\ldots,i_M}$.

=== General flattenings ===
For any permutation $\pi \in \mathfrak{S}_M$ there is a canonical isomorphism between the two tensor products of vector spaces $V_1 \otimes V_2 \otimes \cdots \otimes V_M$ and $V_{\pi(1)} \otimes V_{\pi(2)} \otimes \cdots \otimes V_{\pi(M)}$. Parentheses are usually omitted from such products due to the natural isomorphism between $V_i\otimes(V_j\otimes V_k)$ and $(V_i\otimes V_j)\otimes V_k$, but may, of course, be reintroduced to emphasize a particular grouping of factors. In the grouping, $(V_{\pi(1)} \otimes \cdots \otimes V_{\pi(r_1)})\otimes(V_{\pi(r_1+1)} \otimes \cdots \otimes V_{\pi(r_2)})\otimes\cdots\otimes(V_{\pi(r_{L-1}+1)} \otimes \cdots \otimes V_{\pi(r_L)}),$ there are $L$ groups with $r_l-r_{l-1}$ factors in the $l^\text{th}$ group (where $r_0=0$ and $r_L=M$).

Letting $S_l=(\pi(r_{l-1}+1),\pi(r_{l-1}+2),\ldots,\pi(r_l))$ for each $l$ satisfying $1\le l\le L$, an $(S_1,S_2,\ldots,S_L)$-flattening of a tensor $\mathcal{A}$, denoted $\mathcal{A}_{(S_1,S_2,\ldots,S_L)}$, is obtained by applying the two processes above within each of the $L$ groups of factors. That is, the coordinate representation of the $l^\text{th}$ group of factors is obtained using the isomorphism $(V_{\pi(r_{l-1}+1)} \otimes V_{\pi(r_{l-1}+2)} \otimes \cdots \otimes V_{\pi(r_l)})\simeq(F^{I_{\pi(r_{l-1}+1)}}\otimes F^{I_{\pi(r_{l-1}+2)}}\otimes\cdots\otimes F^{I_{\pi(r_l)}})$, which requires specifying bases for all of the vector spaces $V_k$. The result is then vectorized using a bijection $\mu_l:[I_{\pi(r_{l-1}+1)}]\times[I_{\pi(r_{l-1}+2)}]\times\cdots\times[I_{\pi(r_l)}]\to[I_{S_l}]$ to obtain an element of $F^{I_{S_l}}$, where $I_{S_l} := \prod_{i=r_{l-1}+1}^{r_l} I_{\pi(i)}$, the product of the dimensions of the vector spaces in the $l^\text{th}$ group of factors. The result of applying these isomorphisms within each group of factors is an element of $F^{I_{S_1}} \otimes \cdots \otimes F^{I_{S_L}}$, which is a tensor of order $L$.

=== Vectorization ===
By means of a bijective map $\mu : [I_1] \times \cdots \times [I_M] \to [I_1\cdots I_M]$, a vector space isomorphism between $F^{I_1} \otimes \cdots \otimes F^{I_M}$ and $F^{I_1 \cdots I_M}$ is constructed via the mapping $\mathbf{e}_{i_1}^1 \otimes \cdots \mathbf{e}_{i_m}^m \otimes \cdots \otimes \mathbf{e}_{i_M}^M \mapsto \mathbf{e}_{\mu(i_1,i_2,\ldots,i_M)},$ where for every natural number $i$ such that $1 \le i \le I_1 \cdots I_M$, the vector $\mathbf{e}_i$ denotes the ith standard basis vector of $F^{i_1 \cdots i_M}$. In such a reshaping, the tensor is simply interpreted as a vector in $F^{I_1 \cdots I_M}$. This is known as vectorization, and is analogous to vectorization of matrices. A standard choice of bijection $\mu$ is such that

$$\operatorname{vec}(\mathcal{A}) = \begin{bmatrix} a_{1,1,\ldots,1} & a_{2,1,\ldots,1} & \cdots & a_{n_1,1,\ldots,1} & a_{1,2,1,\ldots,1} & \cdots & a_{I_1,I_2,\ldots,I_M} \end{bmatrix}^T,$$

which is consistent with the way in which the colon operator in Matlab and GNU Octave reshapes a higher-order tensor into a vector. In general, the vectorization of $\mathcal{A}$ is the vector $[ a_{\mu^{-1}(i)} ]_{i=1}^{I_1 \cdots I_M}$.

The vectorization of $\mathcal{A}$ denoted with $vec(\mathcal{A})$ or $\mathcal{A}_{[:]}$ is an $[S_1,S_2]$-reshaping where $S_1 = (1,2,\ldots,M)$ and $S_2=\empty$.

=== Mode-m Flattening / Mode-m Matrixization ===
Let $\mathcal{A} \in F^{I_1} \otimes F^{I_2} \otimes \cdots \otimes F^{I_M}$ be the coordinate representation of an abstract tensor with respect to a basis. Mode-m matrixizing (a.k.a. flattening) of $\mathcal{A}$ is an $[S_1, S_2]$-reshaping in which $S_1 = (m)$ and $S_2 = (1,2,\ldots,m-1,m+1,\ldots,M)$. Usually, a standard matrixizing is denoted by

${\mathbf A}_{[m]} = \mathcal{A}_{[S_1,S_2]}$

This reshaping is sometimes called matrixizing, matricizing, flattening or unfolding in the literature. A standard choice for the bijections $\mu_1,\ \mu_2$ is the one that is consistent with the reshape function in Matlab and GNU Octave, namely

$${\mathbf A}_{[m]} := \begin{bmatrix}
a_{1,1,\ldots,1,1,1,\ldots,1} & a_{2,1,\ldots,1,1,1,\ldots,1} & \cdots & a_{I_1,I_2,\ldots,I_{m-1},1,I_{m+1},\ldots,I_M} \\
a_{1,1,\ldots,1,2,1,\ldots,1} & a_{2,1,\ldots,1,2,1,\ldots,1} & \cdots & a_{I_1,I_2,\ldots,I_{m-1},2,I_{m+1},\ldots,I_M} \\
\vdots & \vdots & & \vdots \\
a_{1,1,\ldots,1,I_m,1,\ldots,1} & a_{2,1,\ldots,1,I_m,1,\ldots,1} & \cdots & a_{I_1,I_2,\ldots,I_{m-1},I_m,I_{m+1},\ldots,I_M}
\end{bmatrix}$$

Definition Mode-m Matrixizing: $[{\mathbf A}_{[m]}]_{jk} = a_{i_1\dots i_m\dots i_M}, \;\; \text{ where } j = i_m \text{ and } k=1+\sum_{n=0\atop n\neq m}^M(i_n - 1) \prod_{l=0\atop l\neq m}^{n-1} I_l.$ The mode-m matrixizing of a tensor ${\mathcal A} \in F^{I_1\times...I_M},$ is defined as the matrix ${\mathbf A}_{[m]} \in F^{I_m \times (I_1 \dots I_{m-1} I_{m+1} \dots I_M)}$. As the parenthetical ordering indicates, the mode-m column vectors are arranged by sweeping all the other mode indices through their ranges, with smaller mode indexes varying more rapidly than larger ones; thus
