= Frank L. Hitchcock =

American mathematician

Frank Lauren Hitchcock
- c. 1910 – c. 1930
- Born: March 6, 1875; New York City, United States
- Died: May 31, 1957 (aged 82); Los Angeles, United States
- Education: Harvard University; Phillips Andover Academy
- Known for: Transportation problem
- Scientific career
- Fields: Chemistry and Mathematics
- Workplaces: Massachusetts Institute of Technology; North Dakota State University
- Doctoral students: Claude Shannon

Frank Lauren Hitchcock (March 6, 1875 – May 31, 1957) was an American mathematician and physicist known for his formulation of the transportation problem in 1941.

== Academic life ==
Frank did his preparatory study at Phillips Andover Academy. He entered Harvard University and completed his bachelor's degree in 1896. Then he began teaching, first in Paris and at Kenyon College in Gambier, Ohio. From 1904 to 1906 he taught chemistry at North Dakota State University, Fargo.

Hitchcock returned to Massachusetts and began to teach at Massachusetts Institute of Technology and study at the graduate level at Harvard. In 1910 he obtained a Ph.D. with a thesis entitled, Vector Functions of a Point. Hitchcock stayed at MIT until retirement, publishing his analysis of optimal distribution in 1941.

== Personal life ==
Frank Hitchcock was descended from New England forebears. His mother was Susan Ida Porter (b. January 1, 1848, Middlebury, Vermont) and his father was Elisha Pike Hitchcock. His parents married on June 27, 1866. Frank was born March 6, 1875, in New York City.

He had two sisters, Mary E. Hitchcock and Viola M. Hitchcock, and two brothers, George P. Hitchcock and Ernest Van Ness Hitchcock. Although Frank was born in New York City, he was raised in Pittsford, Vermont.

Frank married Margaret Johnson Blakely (d. May 22, 1925) in Paris, France, on May 25, 1899. They had three children, Lauren Blakely (1900-1972), who became a chemical engineer and early opponent of air pollution, John Edward (b. January 28, 1906, d. July 26, 1909), and George Blakely, January 12, 1910. At the time of his death Frank had 11 grandchildren and 6 great-grandsons.

== Works ==
- 1910: Vector Functions of a Point.
- 1915: A Classification of Quadratic Vectors Functions, Proceedings of the National Academy of Sciences of the United States of America 1(3):177 to 183.
- 1917: On the simultaneous formulation of two linear vector functions, Proceedings of the Royal Irish Academy Section A 34: 1 to 10.
- 1920: A study of the vector product Vφαθβ, Proceedings of the Royal Irish Academy Section A 35: 30 to 7.
- 1920: A Thermodynamic Study of Electrolytic Solutions, Proceedings of the National Academy of Sciences of the United States of America 6(4):186 to 197.
- 1920: An Identical Relation Connecting Seven Vectors.
- 1921: The Axes of a Quadratic Vector, Proceedings AAAS 56(9):331 to 351.
- 1921: with Norbert Wiener, A New Vector Method in Integral Equations, MIT Journal of Mathematics and Physics volume 1.
- 1923: On Double Polyadics, with Application to the Linear Matrix Equation, Proceedings AAAS 58(10): 355 to 395.
- 1923: Identities Satisfied by Algebraic Point Functions in N-space, Proceedings AAAS 58(11): 399 to 421.
- 1923: with Clark S. Robinson, Differential Equations in Applied Chemistry, John Wiley & Sons, now from Archive.org.
- 1923: A Method for the Numerical Solution of Integral Equations.
- 1924: The Coincident Points of Two Algebraic Transformations.
- 1922: A Solution of the Linear Matrix Equation by Double Multiplication.
- 1927: The Expression of a Tensor or a Polyadic as a Sum or Products, Journal of Mathematics and Physics, 6(1):164-189
