= Multilinear algebra =

Branch of mathematics

Multilinear algebra is the study of functions with multiple vector-valued arguments, with the functions being linear maps with respect to each argument. It involves concepts such as matrices, tensors, multivectors, systems of linear equations, higher-dimensional spaces, determinants, inner and outer products, and dual spaces. It is a mathematical tool used in engineering, machine learning, physics, and mathematics.

== Origin ==
While many theoretical concepts and applications involve single vectors, mathematicians such as Hermann Grassmann considered structures involving pairs, triplets, and multivectors that generalize vectors. With multiple combinational possibilities, the space of multivectors expands to 2^{n} dimensions, where n is the dimension of the relevant vector space. The determinant can be formulated abstractly using the structures of multilinear algebra.

Multilinear algebra appears in the study of the mechanical response of materials to stress and strain, involving various moduli of elasticity. The term "tensor" describes elements within the multilinear space due to its added structure. Despite Grassmann's early work in 1844 with his Ausdehnungslehre, which was also republished in 1862, the subject was initially not widely understood, as even ordinary linear algebra posed many challenges at the time.

The concepts of multilinear algebra find applications in certain studies of multivariate calculus and manifolds, particularly concerning the Jacobian matrix. Infinitesimal differentials encountered in single-variable calculus are transformed into differential forms in multivariate calculus, and their manipulation is carried out using exterior algebra.

Following Grassmann, developments in multilinear algebra were made by Victor Schlegel in 1872 with the publication of the first part of his System der Raumlehre and by Elwin Bruno Christoffel. Notably, significant advancements came through the work of Gregorio Ricci-Curbastro and Tullio Levi-Civita, particularly in the form of absolute differential calculus within multilinear algebra. Marcel Grossmann and Michele Besso introduced this form to Albert Einstein, and in 1915, Einstein's publication on general relativity, explaining the precession of Mercury's perihelion, established multilinear algebra and tensors as important mathematical tools in physics.

In 1958, Nicolas Bourbaki included a chapter on multilinear algebra titled "Algèbre Multilinéaire" in their series Éléments de mathématique, specifically within the algebra book. The chapter covers topics such as bilinear functions, the tensor product of two modules, and the properties of tensor products.

== Applications ==
Multilinear algebra concepts find applications in various areas, including:

- Classical treatment of tensors
- Dyadic tensor
- Glossary of tensor theory
- Metric tensor
- Bra–ket notation
- Multilinear subspace learning

== See also ==
- Multivector
- Geometric algebra
- Clifford algebra
- Closed and exact differential forms
- Component-free treatment of tensors
- Cramer's rule
- Dual space
- Einstein notation
- Exterior algebra
- Inner product
- Outer product
- Kronecker delta
- Levi-Civita symbol
- Multilinear form
- Pseudoscalar
- Pseudovector
- Spinor
- Tensor
- Tensor algebra, Free algebra
- Tensor contraction
- Symmetric algebra, Symmetric power
- Symmetric tensor
- Mixed tensor
