= List of formulas in Riemannian geometry =

This is a list of formulas encountered in Riemannian geometry. Einstein notation is used throughout this article. This article uses the "analyst's" sign convention for Laplacians, except when noted otherwise.

== Christoffel symbols, covariant derivative ==
In a smooth coordinate chart, the Christoffel symbols of the first kind are given by

$$\Gamma_{kij}=\frac12 \left(
\frac{\partial}{\partial x^j} g_{ki}
+\frac{\partial}{\partial x^i} g_{kj}
-\frac{\partial}{\partial x^k} g_{ij}
\right)
=\frac12 \left( g_{ki,j} + g_{kj,i} - g_{ij,k} \right) \,,$$

and the Christoffel symbols of the second kind by

$$\begin{align}
\Gamma^m{}_{ij} &= g^{mk}\Gamma_{kij}\\
&=\frac{1}{2}\, g^{mk} \left(
\frac{\partial}{\partial x^j} g_{ki}
+\frac{\partial}{\partial x^i} g_{kj}
-\frac{\partial}{\partial x^k} g_{ij}
\right)
=\frac{1}{2}\, g^{mk} \left( g_{ki,j} + g_{kj,i} - g_{ij,k} \right) \,.
\end{align}$$

Here $g^{ij}$ is the inverse matrix to the metric tensor $g_{ij}$. In other words,

$$\delta^i{}_j = g^{ik}g_{kj}$$

and thus

$$n = \delta^i{}_i = g^i{}_i = g^{ij}g_{ij}$$

is the dimension of the manifold. Additionally, we can take the trace of contravariant tensors with respect to $g$ as follows (and similarly for covariant ones): let $T$ be a $(2,0)$ tensor, then its trace with respect to $g$ is

$$\operatorname{tr}_g T = \operatorname{tr}(v \mapsto g^{-1} T(v,-))$$

where $g^{-1}$ is the isomorphism between the cotangent space and the tangent space.

Christoffel symbols satisfy the symmetry relations

$\Gamma_{kij} = \Gamma_{kji}$ or, respectively, $\Gamma^i{}_{jk}=\Gamma^i{}_{kj},$

the second of which is equivalent to the torsion-freeness of the Levi-Civita connection.

The contracting relations on the Christoffel symbols are given by

$$\Gamma^i{}_{ki}=\frac{1}{2} g^{im}\frac{\partial g_{im}}{\partial x^k}=\frac{1}{2g} \frac{\partial g}{\partial x^k} = \frac{\partial \log \sqrt{|g|}}{\partial x^k}$$

and

$$g^{k\ell}\Gamma^i{}_{k\ell}=\frac{-1}{\sqrt{|g|}} \;\frac{\partial\left(\sqrt{|g|}\,g^{ik}\right)} {\partial x^k}$$

where |g| is the absolute value of the determinant of the matrix of scalar coefficients of the metric tensor $g_{ik}$. These are useful when dealing with divergences and Laplacians (see below).

The covariant derivative of a vector field with components $v^i$ is given by:

$$v^i {}_{;j}=(\nabla_j v)^i=\frac{\partial v^i}{\partial x^j}+\Gamma^i{}_{jk}v^k$$

and similarly, the covariant derivative of a $(0,1)$-tensor field with components $v_i$ is given by:

$$v_{i;j}=(\nabla_j v)_i=\frac{\partial v_i}{\partial x^j}-\Gamma^k{}_{ij} v_k$$

For a $(2,0)$-tensor field with components $v^{ij}$ this becomes

$$v^{ij}{}_{;k}=\nabla_k v^{ij}=\frac{\partial v^{ij}}{\partial x^k} +\Gamma^i{}_{k\ell}v^{\ell j}+\Gamma^j{}_{k\ell}v^{i\ell}$$

and likewise for tensors with more indices.

The covariant derivative of a function (scalar) $\phi$ is just its usual differential:

$$\nabla_i \phi=\phi_{;i}=\phi_{,i}=\frac{\partial \phi}{\partial x^i}$$

Because the Levi-Civita connection is metric-compatible, the covariant derivative of the metric vanishes,

$$(\nabla_k g)_{ij} = 0, \quad (\nabla_k g)^{ij} = 0$$

as well as the covariant derivatives of the metric's determinant (and volume element)

$$\nabla_k \sqrt{|g|}=0$$

The geodesic $X(t)$ starting at the origin with initial speed $v^i$ has Taylor expansion in the chart:

$$X(t)^i=tv^i-\frac{t^2}{2}\Gamma^i{}_{jk}v^jv^k+O(t^3)$$

A coordinates-free formula for the Levi-Civita connection (albeit being implicit) is the following:
$$g(Z, \nabla_Y X)
=
\frac{1}{2}\Big(
X( g(Y,Z))
+
Y( g(X,Z))
-
Z( g(X,Y))
+
g(Y,[Z, X])
+
g(X,[Z, Y])
-
g(Z, [X,Y])
\Big)$$

== Curvature tensors ==
=== Definitions ===
==== (3,1) Riemann curvature tensor ====
- $${R_{ijk}}^l=\frac{\partial\Gamma_{jk}^l}{\partial x^i}-\frac{\partial\Gamma_{ik}^l}{\partial x^j}+ \big(\Gamma_{jk}^p\Gamma_{ip}^l-\Gamma_{ik}^p\Gamma_{jp}^l\big)$$
- $$R(u,v)w=\nabla_u\nabla_vw-\nabla_v\nabla_uw-\nabla_{[u,v]}w$$

==== (1,3) Riemann curvature tensor ====
- $${R^i_{jkl}}=\frac{\partial\Gamma_{lj}^i}{\partial x^k}-\frac{\partial\Gamma_{kj}^i}{\partial x^l}+ \big(\Gamma_{kp}^i\Gamma_{lj}^p-\Gamma_{lp}^i\Gamma_{kj}^p\big)$$

==== Ricci curvature ====
- $R_{ik}={R_{ijk}}^j$
- $\operatorname{Ric}(v,w)=\operatorname{tr}(u\mapsto R(u,v)w)$

==== Scalar curvature ====
- $R= g^{ik}R_{ik}$
- $R=\operatorname{tr}_g\operatorname{Ric}$

==== Traceless Ricci tensor ====
- $Q_{ik}=R_{ik}-\frac{1}{n}Rg_{ik}$
- $Q(u,v)=\operatorname{Ric}(u,v)-\frac{1}{n}Rg(u,v)$

==== (4,0) Riemann curvature tensor ====
- $R_{ijkl}= {R_{ijk}}^pg_{pl}$
- $\operatorname{Rm}(u,v,w,x)=g\big(R(u,v)w,x\big)$

==== (4,0) Weyl tensor ====
- $$W_{ijkl}=R_{ijkl}-\frac{1}{n(n-1)}R\big(g_{ik}g_{jl}-g_{il}g_{jk}\big)-\frac{1}{n-2}\big(Q_{ik}g_{jl}-Q_{jk}g_{il}-Q_{il}g_{jk}+Q_{jl}g_{ik}\big)$$
- $$W(u,v,w,x)=\operatorname{Rm}(u,v,w,x)-\frac{1}{n(n-1)}R\big(g(u,w)g(v,x)-g(u,x)g(v,w)\big)-\frac{1}{n-2}\big(Q(u,w)g(v,x)-Q(v,w)g(u,x)-Q(u,x)g(v,w)+Q(v,x)g(u,w)\big)$$

==== Einstein tensor ====
- $G_{ik}=R_{ik}-\frac{1}{2}Rg_{ik}$
- $G(u,v)=\operatorname{Ric}(u,v)-\frac{1}{2}Rg(u,v)$

=== Identities ===
==== Basic symmetries ====
- ${R_{ijk}}^l=-{R_{jik}}^l$
- $R_{ijkl}=-R_{jikl}=-R_{ijlk}=R_{klij}$

The Weyl tensor has the same basic symmetries as the Riemann tensor, but its 'analogue' of the Ricci tensor is zero:

- $W_{ijkl}=-W_{jikl}=-W_{ijlk}=W_{klij}$
- $g^{il}W_{ijkl}=0$

The Ricci tensor, the Einstein tensor, and the traceless Ricci tensor are symmetric 2-tensors:

- $R_{jk}=R_{kj}$
- $G_{jk}=G_{kj}$
- $Q_{jk}=Q_{kj}$

==== First Bianchi identity ====
- $R_{ijkl}+R_{jkil}+R_{kijl}=0$
- $W_{ijkl}+W_{jkil}+W_{kijl}=0$

==== Second Bianchi identity ====
- $\nabla_pR_{ijkl}+\nabla_iR_{jpkl}+\nabla_jR_{pikl}=0$
- $$(\nabla_u\operatorname{Rm})(v,w,x,y)+(\nabla_v\operatorname{Rm})(w,u,x,y)+(\nabla_w\operatorname{Rm})(u,v,x,y)=0$$

==== Contracted second Bianchi identity ====
- $\nabla_jR_{pk}-\nabla_pR_{jk}=\nabla^lR_{jpkl}$
- $$(\nabla_u\operatorname{Ric})(v,w)-(\nabla_v\operatorname{Ric})(u,w)=-\operatorname{tr}_g\big((x,y)\mapsto(\nabla_x\operatorname{Rm})(u,v,w,y)\big)$$

==== Twice-contracted second Bianchi identity ====
- $g^{pq}\nabla_pR_{qk}=\frac{1}{2}\nabla_k R$
- $\operatorname{div}_g\operatorname{Ric}=\frac{1}{2}dR$

Equivalently:

- $g^{pq}\nabla_pG_{qk}=0$
- $\operatorname{div}_gG=0$

==== Ricci identity ====
If $X$ is a vector field then

$$\nabla_i\nabla_jX^k-\nabla_j\nabla_iX^k=-{R_{ijp}}^kX^p,$$

which is just the definition of the Riemann tensor. If $\omega$ is a one-form then

$$\nabla_i\nabla_j\omega_k-\nabla_j\nabla_i\omega_k={R_{ijk}}^p\omega_p.$$

More generally, if $T$ is a (0,k)-tensor field then

$$\nabla_i\nabla_j T_{l_1\cdots l_k}-\nabla_j\nabla_iT_{l_1\cdots l_k}={R_{ijl_1}}^pT_{pl_2\cdots l_k}+\cdots+{R_{ijl_k}}^pT_{l_1\cdots l_{k-1}p}.$$

==== Remarks ====
A classical result says that $W=0$ if and only if $(M,g)$ is locally conformally flat, i.e. if and only if $M$ can be covered by smooth coordinate charts relative to which the metric tensor is of the form $g_{ij}=e^\varphi \delta_{ij}$ for some function $\varphi$ on the chart.

== Gradient, divergence, Laplace–Beltrami operator ==
The gradient of a function $\phi$ is obtained by raising the index of the differential $\partial_i\phi dx^i$, whose components are given by:

$$\nabla^i \phi=\phi^{;i}=g^{ik}\phi_{;k}=g^{ik}\phi_{,k}=g^{ik}\partial_k \phi=g^{ik}\frac{\partial \phi}{\partial x^k}$$

The divergence of a vector field with components $V^m$ is

$$\nabla_m V^m = \frac{\partial V^m}{\partial x^m} + V^k \frac{\partial \log \sqrt{|g|}}{\partial x^k} = \frac{1}{\sqrt{|g|}} \frac{\partial (V^m\sqrt{|g|})}{\partial x^m}.$$

The Laplace–Beltrami operator acting on a function $f$ is given by the divergence of the gradient:

$$\begin{align}
\Delta f &= \nabla_i \nabla^i f
= \frac{1}{\sqrt{|g|}} \frac{\partial }{\partial x^j}\left(g^{jk}\sqrt{|g|}\frac{\partial f}{\partial x^k}\right) \\
&=
g^{jk}\frac{\partial^2 f}{\partial x^j \partial x^k} + \frac{\partial g^{jk}}{\partial x^j} \frac{\partial
f}{\partial x^k} + \frac12 g^{jk}g^{il}\frac{\partial g_{il}}{\partial x^j}\frac{\partial f}{\partial x^k}
= g^{jk}\frac{\partial^2 f}{\partial x^j \partial x^k} - g^{jk}\Gamma^l{}_{jk}\frac{\partial f}{\partial x^l}
\end{align}$$

The divergence of an antisymmetric tensor field of type $(2,0)$ simplifies to

$$\nabla_k A^{ik}= \frac{1}{\sqrt{|g|}} \frac{\partial (A^{ik}\sqrt{|g|})}{\partial x^k}.$$

The Hessian of a map $\phi: M \rightarrow N$ is given by

$$\left( \nabla \left( d \phi\right) \right) _{ij} ^\gamma= \frac{\partial ^2 \phi ^\gamma}{\partial x^i \partial x^j}- ^M \Gamma  ^k{}_{ij} \frac{\partial \phi ^\gamma}{\partial x^k} + ^N \Gamma ^{\gamma}{}_{\alpha \beta} \frac{\partial \phi ^\alpha}{\partial x^i}\frac{\partial \phi ^\beta}{\partial x^j}.$$

== Kulkarni–Nomizu product ==
The Kulkarni–Nomizu product is an important tool for constructing new tensors from existing tensors on a Riemannian manifold. Let $A$ and $B$ be symmetric covariant 2-tensors. In coordinates,

$$A_{ij} = A_{ji} \qquad \qquad B_{ij} = B_{ji}$$

Then we can multiply these in a sense to get a new covariant 4-tensor, which is often denoted $A {~\wedge\!\!\!\!\!\!\!\!\;\bigcirc~} B$. The defining formula is

$$\left(A {~\wedge\!\!\!\!\!\!\!\!\;\bigcirc~} B\right)_{ijkl} = A_{ik}B_{jl} + A_{jl}B_{ik} - A_{il}B_{jk} - A_{jk}B_{il}$$

Clearly, the product satisfies

$$A {~\wedge\!\!\!\!\!\!\!\!\;\bigcirc~} B = B {~\wedge\!\!\!\!\!\!\!\!\;\bigcirc~} A$$

== In an inertial frame ==
An orthonormal inertial frame is a coordinate chart such that, at the origin, one has the relations $g_{ij}=\delta_{ij}$ and $\Gamma^i{}_{jk}=0$ (but these may not hold at other points in the frame). These coordinates are also called normal coordinates. In such a frame, the expression for several operators is simpler. Note that the formulae given below are valid at the origin of the frame only.

$$R_{ik\ell m}=\frac{1}{2}\left(
\frac{\partial^2g_{im}}{\partial x^k \partial x^\ell}
+ \frac{\partial^2g_{k\ell}}{\partial x^i \partial x^m}
- \frac{\partial^2g_{i\ell}}{\partial x^k \partial x^m}
- \frac{\partial^2g_{km}}{\partial x^i \partial x^\ell} \right)$$
$$R^\ell{}_{ijk}=
\frac{\partial}{\partial x^j} \Gamma^\ell{}_{ik}-\frac{\partial}{\partial x^k}\Gamma^\ell{}_{ij}$$

== Conformal change ==
Let $g$ be a Riemannian or pseudo-Riemannian metric on a smooth manifold $M$, and $\varphi$ a smooth real-valued function on $M$. Then

$$\tilde g = e^{2\varphi}g$$

is also a Riemannian metric on $M$. We say that $\tilde g$ is (pointwise) conformal to $g$. Evidently, conformality of metrics is an equivalence relation. Here are some formulas for conformal changes in tensors associated with the metric. (Quantities marked with a tilde will be associated with $\tilde g$, while those unmarked with such will be associated with $g$.)

=== Levi-Civita connection ===
- $$\widetilde{\Gamma}_{ij}^k=\Gamma_{ij}^k+\frac{\partial\varphi}{\partial x^i}\delta_j^k+\frac{\partial\varphi}{\partial x^j}\delta_i^k-\frac{\partial\varphi}{\partial x^l}g^{lk}g_{ij}$$
- $$\widetilde{\nabla}_XY=\nabla_XY+d\varphi(X)Y+d\varphi(Y)X-g(X,Y)\nabla \varphi$$

=== (4,0) Riemann curvature tensor ===
- $$\widetilde{R}_{ijkl}=e^{2\varphi}R_{ijkl}+e^{2\varphi}\big(g_{ik}T_{jl}+g_{jl}T_{ik}-g_{il}T_{jk}-g_{jk}T_{il}\big)$$
  where
  $$T_{ij}=\nabla_i\nabla_j\varphi-\nabla_i\varphi\nabla_j\varphi+\frac{1}{2}|d\varphi|^2g_{ij}$$

Using the Kulkarni–Nomizu product:

- $$\widetilde{\operatorname{Rm}} = e^{2\varphi}\operatorname{Rm} + e^{2\varphi}g {~\wedge\!\!\!\!\!\!\!\!\;\bigcirc~} \left( \operatorname{Hess}\varphi - d\varphi\otimes d\varphi + \frac{1}{2}|d\varphi|^2g    \right)$$

=== Ricci tensor ===
- $$\widetilde{R}_{ij}=R_{ij}-(n-2)\big(\nabla_i\nabla_j\varphi-\nabla_i\varphi\nabla_j\varphi\big)-\big(\Delta\varphi+(n-2)|d\varphi|^2\big)g_{ij}$$
- $$\widetilde{\operatorname{Ric}}=\operatorname{Ric}-(n-2)\big(\operatorname{Hess}\varphi-d\varphi\otimes d\varphi\big)-\big(\Delta\varphi+(n-2)|d\varphi|^2\big)g$$

=== Scalar curvature ===
- $$\widetilde{R}=e^{-2\varphi}R-2(n-1)e^{-2\varphi}\Delta\varphi-(n-2)(n-1)e^{-2\varphi}|d\varphi|^2$$
- if $n\neq 2$ this can be written
  $$\tilde R = e^{-2\varphi}\left[R - \frac{4(n-1)}{(n-2)}e^{-(n-2)\varphi/2}\Delta\left( e^{(n-2)\varphi/2} \right) \right]$$

=== Traceless Ricci tensor ===
- $$\widetilde{R}_{ij}-\frac{1}{n}\widetilde{R}\widetilde{g}_{ij}=R_{ij}-\frac{1}{n}Rg_{ij}-(n-2)\big(\nabla_i\nabla_j\varphi-\nabla_i\varphi\nabla_j\varphi\big)+\frac{(n-2)}{n}\big(\Delta\varphi-|d\varphi|^2\big)g_{ij}$$
- $$\widetilde{\operatorname{Ric}}-\frac{1}{n}\widetilde{R}\widetilde{g}=\operatorname{Ric}-\frac{1}{n}Rg-(n-2)\big(\operatorname{Hess}\varphi-d\varphi\otimes d\varphi\big)+\frac{(n-2)}{n}\big(\Delta\varphi-|d\varphi|^2\big)g$$

=== (3,1) Weyl curvature ===
- ${\widetilde{W}_{ijk}}^l={W_{ijk}}^l$
- $\widetilde{W}(X,Y,Z)=W(X,Y,Z)$ for any vector fields $X,Y,Z$

=== Volume form ===
- $\sqrt{\det \widetilde{g}}=e^{n\varphi}\sqrt{\det g}$
- $d\mu_{\widetilde{g}}=e^{n\varphi}\,d\mu_g$

=== Hodge operator on p-forms ===
- $\widetilde{\ast}_{i_1\cdots i_{n-p}}^{j_1\cdots j_p}=e^{(n-2p)\varphi}\ast_{i_1\cdots i_{n-p}}^{j_1\cdots j_p}$
- $\widetilde{\ast}=e^{(n-2p)\varphi}\ast$

=== Codifferential on p-forms ===
- $$\widetilde{d^\ast}_{j_1\cdots j_{p-1}}^{i_1\cdots i_p}=e^{-2\varphi}(d^\ast)_{j_1\cdots j_{p-1}}^{i_1\cdots i_p}-(n-2p)e^{-2\varphi}\nabla^{i_1}\varphi\delta_{j_1}^{i_2}\cdots\delta_{j_{p-1}}^{i_p}$$
- $\widetilde{d^\ast}=e^{-2\varphi}d^\ast-(n-2p)e^{-2\varphi}\iota_{\nabla\varphi}$

=== Laplacian on functions ===
- $$\widetilde{\Delta}\Phi=e^{-2\varphi}\Big(\Delta\Phi + (n-2)g(d\varphi,d\Phi)\Big)$$

=== Hodge Laplacian on p-forms ===
- $$\widetilde{\Delta^d}\omega=e^{-2\varphi}\Big(\Delta^d\omega-(n-2p)d\circ \iota_{\nabla\varphi}\omega-(n-2p-2)\iota_{\nabla\varphi}\circ d\omega+2(n-2p)d\varphi\wedge\iota_{\nabla\varphi}\omega-2d\varphi\wedge d^\ast\omega\Big)$$

The "geometer's" sign convention is used for the Hodge Laplacian here. In particular it has the opposite sign on functions as the usual Laplacian.

=== Second fundamental form of an immersion ===
Suppose $(M,g)$ is Riemannian and $F:\Sigma\to(M,g)$ is a twice-differentiable immersion. Recall that the second fundamental form is, for each $p\in M,$ a symmetric bilinear map $h_p:T_p\Sigma\times T_p\Sigma\to T_{F(p)}M,$ which is valued in the $g_{F(p)}$-orthogonal linear subspace to $dF_p(T_p\Sigma)\subset T_{F(p)}M.$ Then

- $\widetilde{h}(u,v)=h(u,v)-(\nabla\varphi)^\perp g(u,v)$ for all $u,v\in T_pM$

Here $(\nabla\varphi)^\perp$ denotes the $g_{F(p)}$-orthogonal projection of $\nabla\varphi\in T_{F(p)}M$ onto the $g_{F(p)}$-orthogonal linear subspace to $dF_p(T_p\Sigma)\subset T_{F(p)}M.$

=== Mean curvature of an immersion ===
In the same setting as above (and suppose $\Sigma$ has dimension $n$), recall that the mean curvature vector is for each $p\in\Sigma$ an element $\textbf H_p\in T_{F(p)}M$ defined as the $g$-trace of the second fundamental form. Then

- $\widetilde{\textbf H}=e^{-2\varphi}(\textbf H-n(\nabla\varphi)^\perp).$

Note that this transformation formula is for the mean curvature vector, and the formula for the mean curvature $H$ in the hypersurface case is

- $\widetilde{H}=e^{-\varphi}(H-n\langle\nabla\varphi,\eta\rangle)$

where $\eta$ is a (local) normal vector field.

== Variation formulas ==
Let $M$ be a smooth manifold and let $g_t$ be a one-parameter family of Riemannian or pseudo-Riemannian metrics. Suppose that it is a differentiable family in the sense that for any smooth coordinate chart, the derivatives $v_{ij}=\frac{\partial}{\partial t}\big((g_t)_{ij}\big)$ exist and are themselves as differentiable as necessary for the following expressions to make sense. $v=\frac{\partial g}{\partial t}$ is a one-parameter family of symmetric 2-tensor fields.

- $$\frac{\partial}{\partial t}\Gamma_{ij}^k=\frac{1}{2}g^{kp}\Big(\nabla_i v_{jp}+\nabla_jv_{ip}-\nabla_pv_{ij}\Big).$$
- $$\frac{\partial}{\partial t}R_{ijkl}=\frac{1}{2}\Big(\nabla_j\nabla_k v_{il}+\nabla_i\nabla_lv_{jk}-\nabla_i\nabla_kv_{jl}-\nabla_j\nabla_lv_{ik}\Big)+\frac{1}{2}{R_{ijk}}^pv_{pl}-\frac{1}{2}{R_{ijl}}^pv_{pk}$$
- $$\frac{\partial}{\partial t}R_{ik}=\frac{1}{2}\Big(\nabla^p\nabla_kv_{ip}+\nabla_i(\operatorname{div}v)_k-\nabla_i\nabla_k(\operatorname{tr}_gv)-\Delta v_{ik}\Big)+\frac{1}{2}R_i^pv_{pk}-\frac{1}{2} R_i{}^p{}_k{}^qv_{pq}$$
- $$\frac{\partial}{\partial t}R=\operatorname{div}_g\operatorname{div}_gv-\Delta(\operatorname{tr}_gv)-\langle v,\operatorname{Ric}\rangle_g$$
- $\frac{\partial}{\partial t}d\mu_g=\frac{1}{2} g^{pq}v_{pq}\,d\mu_g$
- $$\frac{\partial}{\partial t}\nabla_i\nabla_j\Phi=\nabla_i\nabla_j\frac{\partial\Phi}{\partial t}-\frac{1}{2}g^{kp}\Big(\nabla_i v_{jp}+\nabla_jv_{ip}-\nabla_pv_{ij}\Big)\frac{\partial\Phi}{\partial x^k}$$
- $$\frac{\partial}{\partial t}\Delta\Phi=-\langle v,\operatorname{Hess}\Phi\rangle_g-g\Big(\operatorname{div}v-\frac{1}{2}d(\operatorname{tr}_gv),d\Phi\Big)$$

== Principal symbol ==
The variation formula computations above define the principal symbol of the mapping which sends a pseudo-Riemannian metric to its Riemann tensor, Ricci tensor, or scalar curvature.

- The principal symbol of the map $g\mapsto\operatorname{Rm}^g$ assigns to each $\xi\in T_p^\ast M$ a map from the space of symmetric (0,2)-tensors on $T_pM$ to the space of (0,4)-tensors on $T_pM,$ given by
  $$v\mapsto \frac{\xi_j\xi_kv_{il}+\xi_i\xi_lv_{jk}-\xi_i\xi_kv_{jl}-\xi_j\xi_lv_{ik}}{2} = -\frac12 (\xi \otimes \xi) {~\wedge\!\!\!\!\!\!\!\!\;\bigcirc~} v.$$
- The principal symbol of the map $g\mapsto\operatorname{Ric}^g$ assigns to each $\xi\in T_p^\ast M$ an endomorphism of the space of symmetric 2-tensors on $T_pM$ given by
  $$v\mapsto v(\xi^\sharp,\cdot)\otimes\xi+\xi\otimes v(\xi^\sharp,\cdot)-(\operatorname{tr}_{g_p}v)\xi\otimes\xi-|\xi|_g^2 v.$$
- The principal symbol of the map $g\mapsto R^g$ assigns to each $\xi\in T_p^\ast M$ an element of the dual space to the vector space of symmetric 2-tensors on $T_pM$ by
  $$v\mapsto |\xi|_g^2\operatorname{tr}_gv+v(\xi^\sharp,\xi^\sharp).$$

== See also ==
- Liouville equations
