= Katrin Leschke =

German mathematician

Katrin Leschke (born 1968) is a German mathematician specialising in differential geometry and known for her work on quaternionic analysis and Willmore surfaces. She works in England as a reader in mathematics at the University of Leicester, where she also heads the "Maths Meets Arts Tiger Team", an interdisciplinary group for the popularisation of mathematics, and led the "m:iv" project of international collaboration on minimal surfaces.

== Education and career ==
Leschke did her undergraduate studies at Technische Universität Berlin, and continued there for a PhD, which she completed in 1997. Her dissertation, Homogeneity and Canonical Connections of Isoparametric Manifolds, was jointly supervised by Dirk Ferus and Ulrich Pinkall.

She was a postdoctoral researcher at Technische Universität Berlin from 1997 to 2002, a visiting assistant professor at the University of Massachusetts Amherst from 2002 to 2005, and a researcher and temporary associate professor at the University of Augsburg from 2005 to 2007. At Augsburg, she completed her habilitation, working in the group of Katrin Wendland. She joined the University of Leicester as New Blood Lecturer in 2007 and became reader there in 2016.

== Book ==
Leschke is a coauthor of the book Conformal Geometry of Surfaces in $S^4$ and Quaternions (Springer, 2002), developing the theory of quaternionic analysis.
