= Ravindra Shripad Kulkarni =

Indian mathematician (born 1942)

Ravindra Shripad Kulkarni (born 1942) is an Indian mathematician, specializing in differential geometry. He is known for the Kulkarni–Nomizu product.

== Education and career ==
Ravi S. Kulkarni received in 1968 his Ph.D. from Harvard University under Shlomo Sternberg with thesis Curvature and Metric. For the academic year 1980–1981 he was a Guggenheim Fellow.

After a research and teaching career spanning over 40 years in the US at Johns Hopkins University, Columbia University, Indiana University Bloomington, Queens College of the City University of New York and the Graduate Center of the City University of New York. He returned to India as Distinguished Professor and Director of Harish-Chandra Research Institute, one of three research institutes for Mathematics and Theoretical Physics in India, followed by a 7-year stint at the Indian Institute of Technology Bombay as Mathematics Chair. He is interested in the philosophy of Mathematics and Science, and notes he has “…not yet figured out the enigma of how Ramanujan’s mind worked”.

He has served as the president of the Ramanujan Mathematical Society.

== Selected publications ==
- Kulkarni, Ravindra S. (1969). "Curvature structures and conformal transformations". Bulletin of the American Mathematical Society. 75: 91–94. doi:10.1090/s0002-9904-1969-12155-5. MR 0233306.
- Kulkarni RS (1972). "Conformally Flat Manifolds". Proceedings of the National Academy of Sciences. 69 (9): 2675–2676. Bibcode:1972PNAS...69.2675K. doi:10.1073/pnas.69.9.2675. PMC 427014. PMID 16592016.
- Kulkarni RS (1975). "On complexification of real manifolds". Proceedings of the National Academy of Sciences. 72 (11): 4210. Bibcode:1975PNAS...72.4210K. doi:10.1073/pnas.72.11.4210. PMC 388688. PMID 16592283.
- Kulkarni, R. S. (1975). "A finite version of Schur's theorem". Proceedings of the American Mathematical Society. 53 (2): 440–442. doi:10.1090/s0002-9939-1975-0383295-8. MR 0383295.
- Kulkarni, R. S. (1975). "Conformal geometry in higher dimensions. I." Bulletin of the American Mathematical Society. 81 (4): 736–738. doi:10.1090/s0002-9904-1975-13847-x. MR 0417980.
- Kulkarni, R. S. (1980). "On Hurwitz' "84(g – 1) theorem" and pseudofree actions". Bulletin of the American Mathematical Society. 2 (2): 303–305. doi:10.1090/s0273-0979-1980-14743-6. MR 0555267.
- with Allan L. Edmonds & John H. Ewing: Edmonds, Allan L.; Ewing, John H.; Kulkarni, Ravi S. (1986). "Torsion free subgroups of Fuchsian groups and tessellations of surfaces". Bulletin of the American Mathematical Society. 6 (3): 456–458. doi:10.1090/s0273-0979-1982-15014-5. MR 0648534.
- with Allan L. Edmonds & Robert E. Stong: Edmonds, Allan L.; Kulkarni, Ravi S.; Stong, Robert E. (1984). "Realizability of branched coverings of surfaces". Transactions of the American Mathematical Society. 282 (2): 773–790. doi:10.1090/s0002-9947-1984-0732119-5. MR 0732119.
- with Gregory Constantine: Constantine, Gregory; Kulkarni, Ravi S. (1984). "On a result of S. Delsarte". Proceedings of the American Mathematical Society. 92: 149–152. doi:10.1090/s0002-9939-1984-0749907-7. MR 0749907.
- with Hyman Bass: Bass, Hyman; Kulkarni, Ravi (1990). "On uniform tree lattices". Journal of the American Mathematical Society. 3 (4): 843–902. doi:10.1090/s0894-0347-1990-1065928-2. MR 1065928.
- Kulkarni, Ravi S. (1997). "Riemann surfaces admitting large automorphism groups". Extremal Riemann surfaces (San Francisco, California, 1995). Contemporary Mathematics. Vol. 201. Providence, Rhode Island: American Mathematical Society. pp. 63–79. doi:10.1090/conm/201/02610. ISBN 978-0-8218-0514-5. MR 1429195.
- with Krishnendu Gongopadhyay: Gongopadhyay, Krishnendu; Kulkarni, Ravi S. (2009). "z-classes of isometries of the hyperbolic space". Conformal Geometry and Dynamics. 13 (4): 91–109. arXiv:0707.0487. Bibcode:2009CGDAM..13...91G. doi:10.1090/s1088-4173-09-00190-8. MR 2491719. S2CID 13568444.

=== as editor ===
- with Ulrich Pinkall: Conformal geometry. Aspects of Mathematics (proceedings of a seminar on conformal geometry at the Max-Planck Institute in 1985–1986). Braunsweig & Wiesbaden: Friedr. Vieweg & Sohn. 1988.
