= Kulkarni–Nomizu product =

In the mathematical field of differential geometry, the Kulkarni–Nomizu product (named for Ravindra Shripad Kulkarni and Katsumi Nomizu) is defined for two (0, 2)-tensors and gives as a result a (0, 4)-tensor.

== Definition ==
If h and k are symmetric (0, 2)-tensors, then the product is defined via:

$$\begin{align}
(h {~\wedge\!\!\!\!\!\!\!\!\;\bigcirc~} k)(X_1, X_2, X_3, X_4) :={}
&h(X_1, X_3)k(X_2, X_4) + h(X_2, X_4)k(X_1, X_3) \\
&{}- h(X_1, X_4)k(X_2, X_3) - h(X_2, X_3)k(X_1, X_4) \\[3pt]
{}={} &\begin{vmatrix}
h(X_1, X_3) &h (X_1, X_4)\\
k(X_2, X_3) &k (X_2, X_4)
\end{vmatrix} + \begin{vmatrix}
k(X_1, X_3) &k (X_1, X_4)\\
h(X_2, X_3) &h (X_2, X_4)
\end{vmatrix}
\end{align}$$

where the X_{j} are tangent vectors and $|\cdot|$ is the matrix determinant. Note that $h {~\wedge\!\!\!\!\!\!\!\!\;\bigcirc~} k = k {~\wedge\!\!\!\!\!\!\!\!\;\bigcirc~} h$, as it is clear from the second expression.

With respect to a basis $\{\partial_i\}$ of the tangent space, it takes the compact form

$$(h~\wedge\!\!\!\!\!\!\!\!\;\bigcirc~k)_{ijlm}
= (h{~\wedge\!\!\!\!\!\!\!\!\;\bigcirc~}k )(\partial_i, \partial_j, \partial_l,\partial_m)
= 2h_{i [l}k_{m]j} + 2h_{j [m}k_{l]i}\,,$$

where $[\dots]$ denotes the total antisymmetrisation symbol.

The Kulkarni–Nomizu product is a special case of the product in the graded algebra

$$\bigoplus_{p=1}^n S^2\left(\Omega^p M\right),$$

where, on simple elements,

$$(\alpha\cdot\beta) {~\wedge\!\!\!\!\!\!\!\!\;\bigcirc~} (\gamma\cdot\delta) = (\alpha\wedge\gamma)\odot(\beta\wedge\delta)$$

($\odot$ denotes the symmetric product).

== Properties ==
The Kulkarni–Nomizu product of a pair of symmetric tensors has the algebraic symmetries of the Riemann tensor. For instance, on space forms (i.e. spaces of constant sectional curvature) and two-dimensional smooth Riemannian manifolds, the Riemann curvature tensor has a simple expression in terms of the Kulkarni–Nomizu product of the metric $g=g_{ij}dx^i\otimes dx^j$ with itself; namely, if we denote by

$$\operatorname{R}(\partial_i, \partial_j) \partial_k = {R^l}_{ijk} \partial_l$$

the (1, 3)-curvature tensor and by

$$\operatorname{Rm}=R_{ijkl} dx^i\otimes dx^j\otimes dx^k\otimes dx^l$$

the Riemann curvature tensor with $R_{ijkl}= g_{im} {R^m}_{jkl}$, then

$$\operatorname{Rm}=\frac{\operatorname{Scal}}{4} g~\wedge\!\!\!\!\!\!\!\!\;\bigcirc~g,$$

where $\operatorname{Scal}=\operatorname{tr}_g\operatorname{Ric}={R^i}_i$ is the scalar curvature and

$$\operatorname{Ric}(Y,Z) =
\operatorname{tr}_g\lbrace X\mapsto\operatorname{R}(X,Y)Z\rbrace$$

is the Ricci tensor, which in components reads $R_{ij}={R^k}_{ikj}$. Expanding the Kulkarni–Nomizu product $g~\wedge\!\!\!\!\!\!\!\!\;\bigcirc~g$ using the definition from above, one obtains

$$R_{ijkl}
= \frac{\operatorname{Scal}}{4} g_{i[k} g_{l]j}
= \frac{\operatorname{Scal}}{2} ( g_{ik} g_{jl} - g_{il} g_{jk} )\,.$$

This is the same expression as stated in the article on the Riemann curvature tensor.

For this very reason, it is commonly used to express the contribution that the Ricci curvature (or rather, the Schouten tensor) and the Weyl tensor each makes to the curvature of a Riemannian manifold. This so-called Ricci decomposition is useful in differential geometry.

When there is a metric tensor g, the Kulkarni–Nomizu product of g with itself is the identity endomorphism of the space of 2-forms, Ω^{2}(M), under the identification (using the metric) of the endomorphism ring End(Ω^{2}(M)) with the tensor product Ω^{2}(M) ⊗ Ω^{2}(M).

A Riemannian manifold has constant sectional curvature k if and only if the Riemann tensor has the form

$$R = \frac{k}{2}g {~\wedge\!\!\!\!\!\!\!\!\;\bigcirc~} g$$

where g is the metric tensor.
