= Ulrich Pinkall =

German mathematician

- Born: 1955 (age 70–71)
- Education: University of Freiburg (1982, PhD)
- Awards: Otto Hahn Medal
- Scientific career
- Fields: Mathematics
- Workplaces: Technische Universität Berlin; Max Planck Institute for Mathematics
- Doctoral advisor: Martin Barner

Ulrich Pinkall (born 1955) is a German mathematician, specializing in differential geometry and computer graphics.

Pinkall studied mathematics at the University of Freiburg with a Diplom in 1979 and a doctorate in 1982 with thesis Dupin'sche Hyperflächen (Dupin's hypersurfaces) under the supervision of Martin Barner. Pinkall was then a research assistant in Freiburg until 1984 and from 1984 to 1986 at the Max Planck Institute for Mathematics in Bonn. In 1985 he completed his habilitation in Bonn with thesis Totale Absolutkrümmung immersierter Flächen (Total absolute curvature of immersed surfaces). Since 1986 he is professor at TU Berlin.

In 1985 he received the Otto Hahn Medal of the Max Planck Society. In 1986 he received a Heisenberg-Stipendium from the Deutsche Forschungsgemeinschaft (DFG). From 1992 to 2003 he was a speaker of the Sonderforschungsbereich (SFB) 288 (differential geometry and quantum physics).

In 1998 he was an Invited Speaker with talk Quaternionic analysis of Riemann surfaces and differential geometry at the International Congress of Mathematicians in Berlin.

== Selected publications ==
- Pinkall, U. (1985). "Regular homotopy classes of immersed surfaces" (PDF). Topology. 24 (4): 421–434. doi:10.1016/0040-9383(85)90013-8.
- Pinkall, U. (1985). "Hopf tori in $S^3$". Inventiones Mathematicae. 81 (2): 379–386. Bibcode:1985InMat..81..379P. doi:10.1007/BF01389060. S2CID 120226082.
- Nomizu, Katsumi; Pinkall, Ulrich (1987). "On the geometry of affine immersions". Mathematische Zeitschrift. 195 (2): 165–178. doi:10.1007/BF01166455. S2CID 121027146.
- Kulkarni, Ravi S.; Pinkall, Ulrich, eds. (1988). Conformal geometry. Max-Planck-Institut für Mathematik, Seminar Bonn 1985/86. F. Vieweg. ISBN 978-3-528-08982-5.
- Karcher, H.; Pinkall, U.; Sterling, I. (1988). "New minimal surfaces in $S^3$". Journal of Differential Geometry. 28 (2): 169–185. doi:10.4310/jdg/1214442276. 1988
- Pinkall, U.; Sterling, I. (1989). "On the Classification of Constant Mean Curvature Tori". The Annals of Mathematics. 130 (2): 407. doi:10.2307/1971425. JSTOR 1971425.
- Burstall, F. E.; Ferus, D.; Pedit, F.; Pinkall, U. (1993). "Harmonic Tori in Symmetric Spaces and Commuting Hamiltonian Systems on Loop Algebras". The Annals of Mathematics. 138 (1): 173–212. doi:10.2307/2946637. JSTOR 2946637.
- Pinkall, Ulrich; Polthier, Konrad (1993). "Computing Discrete Minimal Surfaces and Their Conjugates". Experimental Mathematics. 2: 15–36. doi:10.1080/10586458.1993.10504266.
- Kulkarni, R. S.; Pinkall, U. (1994). "A canonical metric for Möbius structures and its applications". Mathematische Zeitschrift. 216 (1): 89–129. doi:10.1007/BF02572311. S2CID 116845289.
- Bobenko, A. I.; Pinkall, U. (1994). "Discrete surfaces with constant negative Gaussian curvature and the Hirota equation". (No. SFB-288-P-127) P00024647.
- "Discrete isothermic surfaces". Journal für die Reine und Angewandte Mathematik. 1996 (475): 187–208. 1996. doi:10.1515/crll.1996.475.187. S2CID 120432228.
- Bobenko, Alexander I.; Pinkall, Ulrich (1999). "Discretization of surfaces and integrable systems". In Bobenko, Alexander I.; Seiler, Ruedi (eds.). Discrete integrable geometry and physics. Oxford University Press. pp. 3–58. ISBN 9780198501602.
- Ferus, D.; Leschke, K.; Pedit, F.; Pinkall, U. (2001). "Quaternionic holomorphic geometry: Plücker formula, Dirac eigenvalue estimates and energy estimates of harmonic 2-tori". Inventiones Mathematicae. 146 (3): 507–593. arXiv:math/0012238. Bibcode:2001InMat.146..507F. doi:10.1007/s002220100173. S2CID 17979449. arXiv preprint
- Burstall, Francis E.; Ferus, Dirk; Leschke, Katrin; Pedit, Franz; Pinkall, Ulrich (2004-10-20). Conformal Geometry of Surfaces in $S^4$ and Quaternions. Springer. ISBN 9783540453017.
- Springborn, Boris; Schröder, Peter; Pinkall, Ulrich (2008). "Conformal equivalence of triangle meshes". ACM Transactions on Graphics. 27 (3): 1. doi:10.1145/1360612.1360676.
- Chao, Isaac; Pinkall, Ulrich; Sanan, Patrick; Schröder, Peter (2010). "A simple geometric model for elastic deformations". ACM Transactions on Graphics. 29 (4): 1. doi:10.1145/1778765.1778775.
