= Martin Barner =

German mathematician (1921–2020)

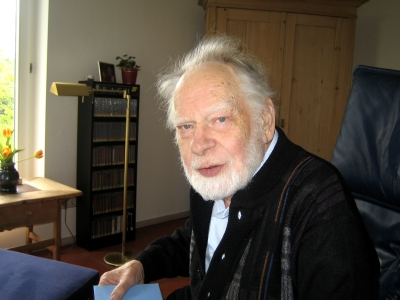
- 85th birthday in Königsfeld
- Born: 19 April 1921; Villingen, Germany
- Died: 31 July 2020 (aged 99)
- Scientific career
- Fields: Differential geometry, Analysis
- Thesis: Zur projektiven Differentialgeometrie der Kurvenpaare (1950)
- Doctoral advisor: Gerrit Door Bol
- Doctoral students: Ulrich Pinkall

Martin Barner (19 April 1921 – 31 July 2020) was a German mathematician working in the fields of differential geometry and analysis. Barner received his doctorate in 1950 at the Albert-Ludwigs-University in Freiburg. From 1957, he was professor in Karlsruhe and from 1962 at his alma mater in Freiburg, where he retired in 1989. From 1963 to 1994, he was director of the Mathematical Research Institute of Oberwolfach and from 1968 to 1977 he was president of the German Mathematical Society.

He died in July 2020 at the age of 99.
