= Riemann curvature tensor =

Tensor field in Riemannian geometry

In the mathematical field of differential geometry, the Riemann curvature tensor or Riemann–Christoffel tensor (after Bernhard Riemann and Elwin Bruno Christoffel) is the most common way used to express the curvature of Riemannian manifolds. It assigns a tensor to each point of a Riemannian manifold (i.e., it is a tensor field). It is a local invariant of Riemannian metrics that measures the failure of the second covariant derivatives to commute. A Riemannian manifold has zero curvature if and only if it is flat, i.e. locally isometric to the Euclidean space. The curvature tensor can also be defined for any pseudo-Riemannian manifold, or indeed any manifold equipped with an affine connection.

It is a central mathematical tool in the theory of general relativity, the modern theory of gravity. The curvature of spacetime is in principle observable via the geodesic deviation equation. The curvature tensor represents the tidal force experienced by a rigid body moving along a geodesic in a sense made precise by the Jacobi equation.

== Definition ==
Let $(M, g)$ be a Riemannian or pseudo-Riemannian manifold, and $\mathfrak{X}(M)$ be the space of all vector fields on $M$. We define the Riemann curvature tensor as a map $\mathfrak{X}(M)\times\mathfrak{X}(M)\times\mathfrak{X}(M)\rightarrow\mathfrak{X}(M)$ by the following formula where $\nabla$ is the Levi-Civita connection:

$$R(X, Y)Z = \nabla_X\nabla_Y Z - \nabla_Y \nabla_X Z - \nabla_{[X, Y]} Z$$

or equivalently

$$R(X, Y) = [\nabla_X,\nabla_Y] - \nabla_{[X, Y]}$$

where $[X,Y]$ is the Lie bracket of vector fields and $[\nabla_X,\nabla_Y]$ is a commutator of differential operators. It turns out that the right-hand side actually only depends on the value of the vector fields $X, Y, Z$ at a given point, which is notable since the covariant derivative of a vector field also depends on the field values in a neighborhood of the point. Hence, $R$ is a $(1,3)$-tensor field. For fixed $X,Y$, the linear transformation $Z \mapsto R(X, Y)Z$ is also called the curvature transformation or endomorphism. Occasionally, the curvature tensor is defined with the opposite sign.

The curvature tensor measures noncommutativity of the covariant derivative, and as such is the integrability obstruction for the existence of an isometry with Euclidean space (called, in this context, flat space).

Since the Levi-Civita connection is torsion-free, its curvature can also be expressed in terms of the second covariant derivative

$$\nabla^2_{X,Y} Z = \nabla_X\nabla_Y Z - \nabla_{\nabla_X Y}Z$$

which depends only on the values of $X, Y$ at a point. The curvature can then be written as

$$R(X, Y) = \nabla^2_{X,Y} - \nabla^2_{Y,X}$$

Thus, the curvature tensor measures the noncommutativity of the second covariant derivative. In abstract index notation,
$$R^d{}_{cab} Z^c = \nabla_a \nabla_b Z^d - \nabla_b \nabla_a Z^d .$$
The Riemann curvature tensor is also the commutator of the covariant derivative of an arbitrary covector $A_{\nu}$ with itself:

$$A_{\nu;\rho\sigma} - A_{\nu;\sigma\rho} = A_{\beta} R^{\beta}{}_{\nu\rho\sigma}.$$

This formula is often called the Ricci identity. This is the classical method used by Ricci and Levi-Civita to obtain an expression for the Riemann curvature tensor. This identity can be generalized to get the commutators for two covariant derivatives of arbitrary tensors as follows

$$\begin{align}
&\nabla_\delta \nabla_\gamma T^{\alpha_1 \cdots \alpha_r}{}_{\beta_1 \cdots \beta_s} - \nabla_\gamma \nabla_\delta T^{\alpha_1 \cdots \alpha_r}{}_{\beta_1 \cdots \beta_s} \\[3pt]
={} &R^{\alpha_1}{}_{\rho\delta\gamma} T^{\rho\alpha_2 \cdots \alpha_r}{}_{\beta_1 \cdots \beta_s} + \ldots +
R^{\alpha_r}{}_{\rho\delta\gamma} T^{\alpha_1 \cdots \alpha_{r-1}\rho}{}_{\beta_1 \cdots \beta_s} -
R^{\sigma}{}_{\beta_1\delta\gamma} T^{\alpha_1 \cdots \alpha_r}{}_{\sigma\beta_2 \cdots \beta_s} - \ldots -
R^{\sigma}{}_{\beta_s\delta\gamma} T^{\alpha_1 \cdots \alpha_r}{}_{\beta_1 \cdots \beta_{s-1}\sigma}
\end{align}$$

This formula also applies to tensor densities without alteration, because for the Levi-Civita (not generic) connection one gets:

$$\nabla_{\mu}\left(\sqrt{g}\right) \equiv \left(\sqrt{g}\right)_{;\mu} = 0,$$

where

$$g = \left|\det\left(g_{\mu\nu}\right)\right|.$$

It is sometimes convenient to also define the purely covariant version of the curvature tensor by

$$R_{\sigma\mu\nu\rho} = g_{\rho\zeta} R^{\zeta}{}_{\sigma\mu\nu}.$$

== Geometric meaning ==
Figure showing the geometric meaning of the Riemann curvature tensor in a spherical curved manifold. The fact that this transfer can define two different arrows at the starting point gives rise to the Riemann curvature tensor. The orthogonal symbol indicates that the dot product (provided by the metric tensor) between the transmitted arrows (or the tangent arrows on the curve) is zero. The angle between the two arrows is zero when the space is flat and greater than zero when the space is curved. The more curved the space, the greater the angle.

=== Informally ===
One can see the effects of curved space by comparing a tennis court and the Earth. Start at the lower right corner of the tennis court, with a racket held out towards north. Then while walking around the outline of the court, at each step make sure the tennis racket is maintained in the same orientation, parallel to its previous positions. Once the loop is complete the tennis racket will be parallel to its initial starting position. This is because tennis courts are built so the surface is flat. On the other hand, the surface of the Earth is curved: we can complete a loop on the surface of the Earth. Starting at the equator, point a tennis racket north along the surface of the Earth. Once again the tennis racket should always remain parallel to its previous position, using the local plane of the horizon as a reference. For this path, first walk to the north pole, then walk sideways (i.e. without turning), then down to the equator, and finally walk backwards to your starting position. Now the tennis racket will be pointing towards the west, even though when you began your journey it pointed north and you never turned your body. This process is akin to parallel transporting a vector along the path and the difference identifies how lines which appear "straight" are only "straight" locally. Each time a loop is completed the tennis racket will be deflected further from its initial position by an amount depending on the distance and the curvature of the surface. It is possible to identify paths along a curved surface where parallel transport works as it does on flat space. These are the geodesics of the space, for example any segment of a great circle of a sphere.

The concept of a curved space in mathematics differs from conversational usage. For example, if the above process was completed on a cylinder one would find that it is not curved overall as the curvature around the cylinder cancels with the flatness along the cylinder, which is a consequence of Gaussian curvature and Gauss's Theorema Egregium. A familiar example of this is a floppy pizza slice, which will remain rigid along its length if it is curved along its width.

The Riemann curvature tensor is a way to capture a measure of the intrinsic curvature. When you write it down in terms of its components (like writing down the components of a vector), it consists of a multi-dimensional array of sums and products of partial derivatives (some of those partial derivatives can be thought of as akin to capturing the curvature imposed upon someone walking in straight lines on a curved surface).

=== Formally ===
When a vector in a Euclidean space is parallel transported around a loop, it will again point in the initial direction after returning to its original position. However, this property does not hold in the general case. The Riemann curvature tensor directly measures the failure of this in a general Riemannian manifold. This failure is known as the non-holonomy of the manifold.

Let $x_t$ be a curve in a Riemannian manifold $M$. Denote by $\tau_{x_t}:T_{x_0}M \to T_{x_t}M$ the parallel transport map along $x_t$. The parallel transport maps are related to the covariant derivative by

$$\nabla_{\dot{x}_0} Y =
\lim_{h\to 0} \frac{1}{h}\left(\tau^{-1}_{x_h}\left(Y_{x_h}\right) - Y_{x_0}\right) =
\left.\frac{d}{dt}\left(\tau_{x_t}^{-1}(Y_{x_t})\right)\right|_{t=0}$$

for each vector field $Y$ defined along the curve.

Suppose that $X$ and $Y$ are a pair of commuting vector fields. Each of these fields generates a one-parameter group of diffeomorphisms in a neighborhood of $x_0$. Denote by $\tau_{tX}$ and $\tau_{tY}$, respectively, the parallel transports along the flows of $X$ and $Y$ for time $t$. Parallel transport of a vector $Z \in T_{x_0}M$ around the quadrilateral with sides $tY$, $sX$, $-tY$, $-sX$ is given by

$$\tau_{sX}^{-1}\tau_{tY}^{-1}\tau_{sX}\tau_{tY}Z.$$

The difference between this and $Z$ measures the failure of parallel transport to return $Z$ to its original position in the tangent space $T_{x_0}M$. Shrinking the loop by sending $s, t \to 0$ gives the infinitesimal description of this deviation:

$$\left.\frac{d}{ds}\frac{d}{dt}\tau_{sX}^{-1}\tau_{tY}^{-1}\tau_{sX}\tau_{tY}Z\right|_{s=t=0} = \left(\nabla_X\nabla_Y - \nabla_Y\nabla_X - \nabla_{[X,Y]}\right)Z = R(X, Y)Z$$

where $R$ is the Riemann curvature tensor.

== Coordinate expression ==
Converting to the tensor index notation, the Riemann curvature tensor is given by

$$R^{\rho}{}_{\sigma\mu\nu} = dx^{\rho}\left(R\left(\partial_{\mu}, \partial_{\nu}\right)\partial_{\sigma}\right)$$

where $\partial_{\mu} = \partial/\partial x^{\mu}$ are the coordinate vector fields. The above expression can be written using Christoffel symbols:

$$R^{\rho}{}_{\sigma\mu\nu} =
\partial_{\mu}\Gamma^{\rho}{}_{\nu\sigma} -
\partial_{\nu}\Gamma^{\rho}{}_{\mu\sigma} +
\Gamma^{\rho}{}_{\mu\lambda}\Gamma^{\lambda}{}_{\nu\sigma} -
\Gamma^{\rho}{}_{\nu\lambda}\Gamma^{\lambda}{}_{\mu\sigma}$$

(See also List of formulas in Riemannian geometry).

== Symmetries and identities ==
The Riemann curvature tensor has the following symmetries and identities:

Skew symmetry	$R(u, v) = -R(v, u)$	$R_{abcd} = -R_{abdc} \Leftrightarrow R_{ab(cd)}=0$
Skew symmetry	$\langle R(u, v)w, z \rangle = -\langle R(u, v)z, w \rangle$	$R_{abcd} = -R_{bacd} \Leftrightarrow R_{(ab)cd}=0$
First (algebraic) Bianchi identity	$R(u, v)w + R(v, w)u + R(w, u)v = 0$	$R_{abcd} + R_{acdb} + R_{adbc} = 0 \Leftrightarrow R_{a[bcd]}=0$
Interchange symmetry	$\langle R(u, v)w, z \rangle = \langle R(w, z)u, v \rangle$	$R_{abcd} = R_{cdab}$
Second (differential) Bianchi identity	$\left(\nabla_uR\right)(v, w) + \left(\nabla_vR\right)(w, u) + \left(\nabla_w R\right)(u, v) = 0$	$R_{abcd;e} + R_{abde;c} + R_{abec;d} = 0 \Leftrightarrow R_{ab[cd;e]} = 0$

where the bracket $\langle,\rangle$ refers to the inner product on the tangent space induced by the metric tensor and the brackets and parentheses on the indices denote the antisymmetrization and symmetrization operators, respectively. If there is nonzero torsion, the Bianchi identities involve the torsion tensor.

The first (algebraic) Bianchi identity was discovered by Ricci, but is often called the first Bianchi identity or algebraic Bianchi identity, because it looks similar to the differential Bianchi identity.

The first three identities form a complete list of symmetries of the curvature tensor, i.e. given any tensor which satisfies the identities above, one can find a Riemannian manifold with such a curvature tensor at some point. Simple calculations show that such a tensor has $n^2\left(n^2 - 1\right)/12$ independent components. Interchange symmetry follows from these. The algebraic symmetries are also equivalent to saying that R belongs to the image of the Young symmetrizer corresponding to the partition 2+2.

On a Riemannian manifold one has the covariant derivative $\nabla_u R$ and the Bianchi identity (often called the second Bianchi identity or differential Bianchi identity) takes the form of the last identity in the table.

== Ricci curvature ==
The Ricci curvature tensor is the contraction of the first and third indices of the Riemann tensor.

$$\underbrace{R_{ab}}_{\text{Ricci}}
\equiv R^c{}_{acb}
= g^{cd} \underbrace{R_{cadb}}_{\text{Riemann}}$$

== Special cases ==
=== Surfaces ===
For a two-dimensional surface, the Bianchi identities imply that the Riemann tensor has only one independent component, which means that the Ricci scalar completely determines the Riemann tensor. There is only one valid expression for the Riemann tensor which fits the required symmetries:

$$R_{abcd} = f(R) \left(g_{ac}g_{db} - g_{ad}g_{cb}\right)$$

and by contracting with the metric twice we find the explicit form:

$$R_{abcd} = K\left(g_{ac}g_{db} - g_{ad}g_{cb}\right) ,$$

where $g_{ab}$ is the metric tensor and $K = R/2$ is a function called the Gaussian curvature and $a$, $b$, $c$ and $d$ take values either 1 or 2. The Riemann tensor has only one functionally independent component. The Gaussian curvature coincides with the sectional curvature of the surface. It is also exactly half the scalar curvature of the 2-manifold, while the Ricci curvature tensor of the surface is simply given by

$$R_{ab} = Kg_{ab}.$$

=== Space forms ===
A Riemannian manifold is a space form if its sectional curvature is equal to a constant $K$. The Riemann tensor of a space form is given by

$$R_{abcd} = K\left(g_{ac}g_{db} - g_{ad}g_{cb}\right).$$

Conversely, except in dimension 2, if the curvature of a Riemannian manifold has this form for some function $K$, then the Bianchi identities imply that $K$ is constant and thus that the manifold is (locally) a space form.

== See also ==
- Introduction to the mathematics of general relativity
- Decomposition of the Riemann curvature tensor
- Curvature of Riemannian manifolds
- Ricci curvature tensor
