= Gregorio Ricci-Curbastro =

Italian mathematician (1853–1925)

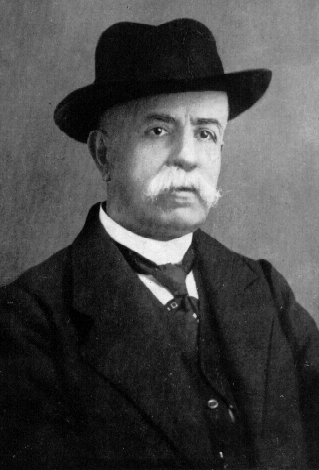
- Born: 12 January 1853; Lugo di Romagna, Italy
- Died: 6 August 1925 (aged 72); Bologna, Italy
- Education: Sapienza University of Rome University of Bologna Scuola Normale Superiore di Pisa
- Known for: Tensor calculus Covariant derivative Ricci calculus Ricci curvature Ricci decomposition Ricci grid Ricci identity
- Scientific career
- Fields: Mathematics
- Doctoral advisor: Ulisse Dini; Enrico Betti
- Doctoral students: Tullio Levi-Civita

Gregorio Ricci-Curbastro (Italian: [ɡreˈɡɔːrjo ˈrittʃi kurˈbastro]; 12 January 1853 – 6 August 1925) was an Italian mathematician. He is most famous as the discoverer of tensor calculus.

With his former student Tullio Levi-Civita, he wrote his most famous single publication, a pioneering work on the calculus of tensors, signing it as Gregorio Ricci. This appears to be the only time that Ricci-Curbastro used the shortened form of his name in a publication, and continues to cause confusion.

Ricci-Curbastro also published important works in other fields, including a book on higher algebra and infinitesimal analysis, and papers on the theory of real numbers, an area in which he extended the research begun by Richard Dedekind.

== Early life and education ==
Completing his high school studies privately at only 16 years of age, he enrolled on the course of philosophy-mathematics at Rome University (1869). The following year, the Papal State fell, and so Gregorio was called by his father to the city of his birth, Lugo di Romagna. Subsequently, he attended courses at University of Bologna during the year 1872 - 1873, then transferred to the Scuola Normale Superiore di Pisa.

In 1875, he graduated in Pisa in physical sciences and mathematics with a thesis on differential equations, entitled "On Fuchs's Research Concerning Linear Differential Equations". During his various travels, he was a student of the mathematicians Enrico Betti, Eugenio Beltrami, Ulisse Dini and Felix Klein.

== Studies on absolute differential calculus ==
In 1877 Ricci-Curbastro obtained a scholarship at the Technical University of Munich, Bavaria, and he later worked as an assistant of Ulisse Dini, his teacher.

In 1880, he became a lecturer of mathematics at the University of Padua, where he dealt with Riemannian geometry and differential quadratic forms.

He formed a research group in which Tullio Levi-Civita worked, with whom he wrote the fundamental treatise on absolute differential calculus (also known as Ricci calculus) with coordinates or tensor calculus on Riemannian manifold, which then became the lingua franca of the subsequent theory of Albert Einstein's general relativity. In fact, absolute differential calculus had a crucial role in developing the theory, as is shown in a letter written by Albert Einstein to Ricci-Curbastro's nephew. In this context, Ricci-Curbastro identified the so-called Ricci tensor, which would have a crucial role within that theory.

=== Influences ===
The advent of tensor calculus in dynamics goes back to Lagrange, who originated the general treatment of a dynamical system, and to Bernhard Riemann, who was the first to think about geometry in an arbitrary number of dimensions. He was also influenced by the works of Elwin Bruno Christoffel and of Rudolf Lipschitz on the quadratic forms. In fact, it was essentially Christoffel's idea of covariant differentiation that allowed Ricci-Curbastro to make the greatest progress.

== Recognition ==
Ricci-Curbastro received many honours for his contributions.

He is honoured by mentions in various Academies, amongst which are:

- The Veneto Institute of Science - Istituto veneto di scienze - letters and articles (from 1892), of which he was then president from 1916 to 1919.
- The Lincei Academy - Accademia dei Lincei - of which he was a member from 1899.
- The Academy of Padua - Accademia di Padova - from 1905.
- The Science Academy of Turin - Accademia delle Scienze di Torino - from 1918.
- The Galileian Academy of Science - Accademia Galileiana di Scienze, Lettere ed Arti - letters and articles, of which he was then president from 1920 to 1922.
- The Academy of Sciences of the Institute of Bologna - Reale Accademia di Bologna - from 1922.
- The Pontifical Academy of Sciences - Accademia Pontificia delle Scienze - from 1925.

He participated actively in political life, both in his native town and in Padua, and contributed with his projects to the Ravenna-area land drainage and the Lugo aqueduct.

An asteroid, 13642 Ricci, is named after him.

== Publications ==
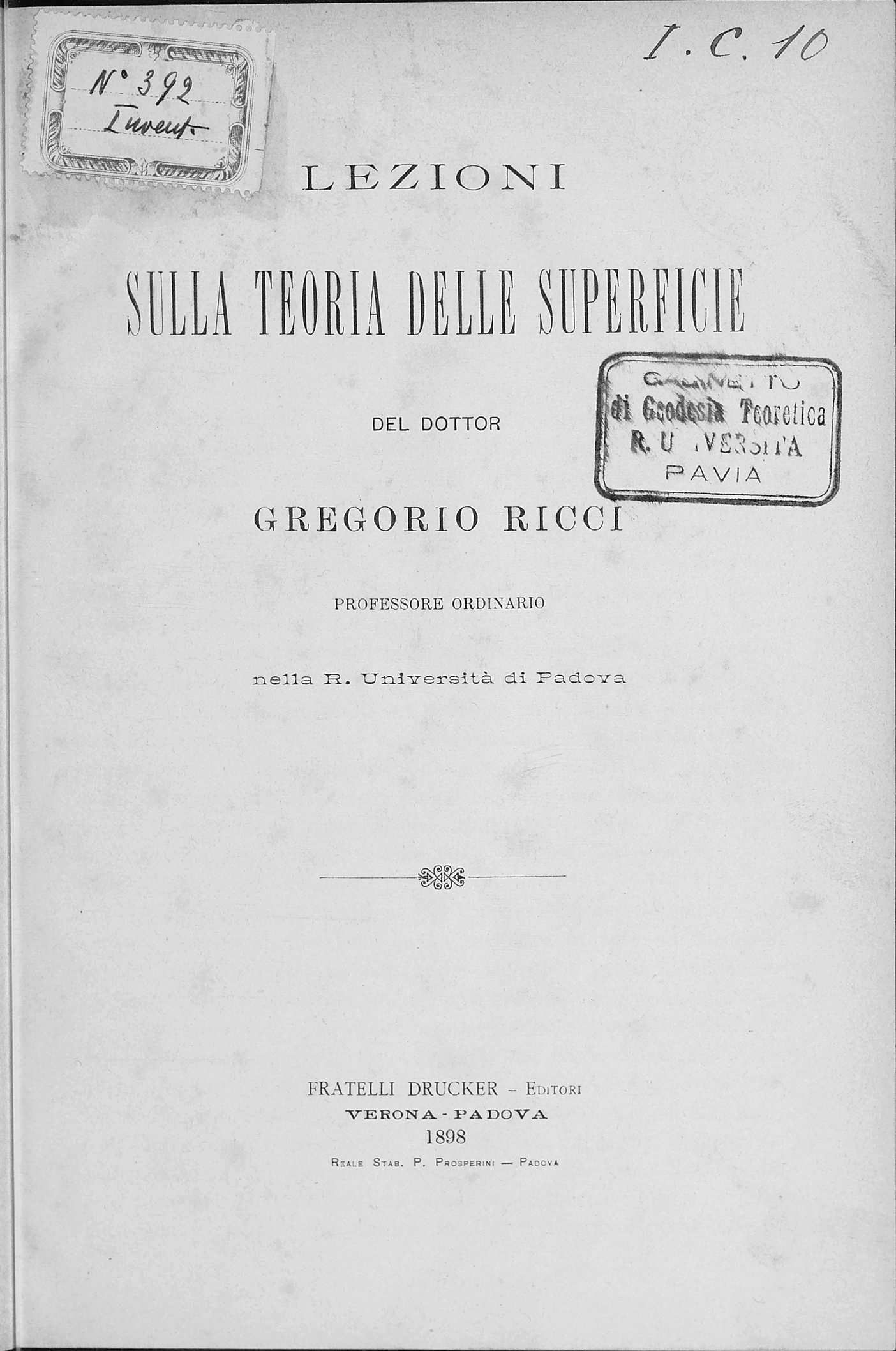
Lezioni sulla teoria delle superficie, 1898

- Ricci-Curbastro, Gregorio (1898), Lezioni sulla teoria delle superficie (in Italian), Verona: Drucker
- Lezioni sulla teoria delle superficie (in Italian). Verona: Fratelli Drucker. 1898.

== See also ==
- Einstein field equations
- Ricci calculus
- Ricci curvature
- Ricci flow
- Ricci scalar
- Ricci scalars (Newman-Penrose formalism)
