= Exterior covariant derivative =

Concept in differential geometry

In the mathematical field of differential geometry, the exterior covariant derivative is an extension of the notion of exterior derivative to the setting of a differentiable principal bundle or vector bundle with a connection.

== Definition ==
Let G be a Lie group and P → M be a principal G-bundle on a smooth manifold M. Suppose there is a connection on P; this yields a natural direct sum decomposition $T_u P = H_u \oplus V_u$ of each tangent space into the horizontal and vertical subspaces. Let $h: T_u P \to H_u$ be the projection to the horizontal subspace.

If ϕ is a k-form on P with values in a vector space V, then its exterior covariant derivative Dϕ is a form defined by

$$D\phi(v_0, v_1,\dots, v_k)= d \phi(h v_0 ,h v_1,\dots, h v_k)$$

where v_{i} are tangent vectors to P at u.

Suppose that ρ : G → GL(V) is a representation of G on a vector space V. If ϕ is equivariant in the sense that

$$R_g^* \phi = \rho(g)^{-1}\phi$$

where $R_g(u) = ug$, then Dϕ is a tensorial (k + 1)-form on P of the type ρ: it is equivariant and horizontal (a form ψ is horizontal if ψ(v_{0}, ..., v_{k}) = ψ(hv_{0}, ..., hv_{k}).)

By abuse of notation, the differential of ρ at the identity element may again be denoted by ρ:

$$\rho: \mathfrak{g} \to \mathfrak{gl}(V).$$

Let $\omega$ be the connection one-form and $\rho(\omega)$ the representation of the connection in $\mathfrak{gl}(V).$ That is, $\rho(\omega)$ is a $\mathfrak{gl}(V)$-valued form, vanishing on the horizontal subspace. If ϕ is a tensorial k-form of type ρ, then

$D \phi = d \phi + \rho(\omega) \cdot \phi,$

where, following the notation in Lie algebra-valued differential form § Operations, we wrote

$$(\rho(\omega) \cdot \phi)(v_1, \dots, v_{k+1}) =
{1 \over (1+k)!} \sum_{\sigma}  \operatorname{sgn}(\sigma)\rho(\omega(v_{\sigma(1)})) \phi(v_{\sigma(2)}, \dots, v_{\sigma(k+1)}).$$

Unlike the usual exterior derivative, which squares to 0, the exterior covariant derivative does not. In general, one has, for a tensorial zero-form ϕ,

$D^2\phi=F \cdot \phi.$

where F = ρ(Ω) is the representation in $\mathfrak{gl}(V)$ of the curvature two-form Ω. The form F is sometimes referred to as the field strength tensor, in analogy to the role it plays in electromagnetism. Note that D^{2} vanishes for a flat connection (i.e. when Ω = 0).

If ρ : G → GL(R^{n}), then one can write

$$\rho(\Omega) = F = \sum {F^i}_j {e^j}_i$$

where ${e^i}_j$ is the matrix with 1 at the (i, j)-th entry and zero on the other entries. The matrix ${F^i}_j$ whose entries are 2-forms on P is called the curvature matrix.

== For vector bundles ==
Given a smooth real vector bundle E → M with a connection ∇ and rank r, the exterior covariant derivative is a real-linear map on the vector-valued differential forms that are valued in E:

$$d^\nabla:\Omega^k(M,E)\to\Omega^{k+1}(M,E).$$

The covariant derivative is such a map for k = 0. The exterior covariant derivatives extends this map to general k. There are several equivalent ways to define this object:

- Suppose that a vector-valued differential 2-form is regarded as assigning to each p a multilinear map s_{p}: T_{p}M × T_{p}M → E_{p} which is completely anti-symmetric. Then the exterior covariant derivative d^{∇} s assigns to each p a multilinear map T_{p}M × T_{p}M × T_{p}M → E_{p} given by the formula

$$\begin{align}\nabla_{x_1}(s(X_2,X_3))&-\nabla_{x_2}(s(X_1,X_3))+\nabla_{x_3}(s(X_1,X_2))\\ &-s([X_1,X_2],x_3)+s([X_1,X_3],x_2)-s([X_2,X_3],x_1).\end{align}$$

where x_{1}, x_{2}, x_{3} are arbitrary tangent vectors at p which are extended to smooth locally-defined vector fields X_{1}, X_{2} X_{3}. The legitimacy of this definition depends on the fact that the above expression depends only on x_{1}, x_{2}, x_{3}, and not on the choice of extension. This can be verified by the Leibniz rule for covariant differentiation and for the Lie bracket of vector fields. The pattern established in the above formula in the case k = 2 can be directly extended to define the exterior covariant derivative for arbitrary k.

- The exterior covariant derivative may be characterized by the axiomatic property of defining for each k a real-linear map Ω^{k}(M, E) → Ω^{k + 1}(M, E) which for k = 0 is the covariant derivative and in general satisfies the Leibniz rule

$$d^\nabla(\omega \wedge s) = (d\omega) \wedge s + (-1)^k \omega \wedge (d^\nabla s)$$

for any differential k-form ω and any vector-valued form s. This may also be viewed as a direct inductive definition. For instance, for any vector-valued differential 1-form s and any local frame e_{1}, ..., e_{r} of the vector bundle, the coordinates of s are locally-defined differential 1-forms ω^{1}, ..., ω^{r}. The above inductive formula then says that

$$\begin{align}
d^\nabla s&=d^\nabla(\omega^1 e_1+\cdots+\omega^r e_r)\\
&=(d\omega^1)  e_1+\cdots+(d\omega^r) e_r-\omega^1 \nabla e_1-\cdots-\omega^r\nabla e_r.\end{align}$$

In order for this to be a legitimate definition of d^{∇}s, it must be verified that the choice of local frame is irrelevant. This can be checked by considering a second local frame obtained by an arbitrary change-of-basis matrix; the inverse matrix provides the change-of-basis matrix for the 1-forms ω_{1}, ..., ω_{r}. When substituted into the above formula, the Leibniz rule as applied for the standard exterior derivative and for the covariant derivative ∇ cancel out the arbitrary choice.

- A vector-valued differential 2-form s may be regarded as a certain collection of functions s^{α}_{ij} assigned to an arbitrary local frame of E over a local coordinate chart of M. The exterior covariant derivative is then defined as being given by the functions

$$(d^\nabla s)^\alpha{}_{ijk}=\nabla_is^\alpha{}_{jk}-\nabla_js^\alpha{}_{ik}+\nabla_ks^\alpha{}_{ij}.$$

The fact that this defines a tensor field valued in E is a direct consequence of the same fact for the covariant derivative. The further fact that it is a differential 3-form valued in E asserts the full anti-symmetry in i, j, k and is directly verified from the above formula and the contextual assumption that s is a vector-valued differential 2-form, so that s^{α}_{ij} = −s^{α}_{ji}. The pattern in this definition of the exterior covariant derivative for k = 2 can be directly extended to larger values of k.
This definition may alternatively be expressed in terms of an arbitrary local frame of E but without considering coordinates on M. Then a vector-valued differential 2-form is expressed by differential 2-forms s^{1}, ..., s^{r} and the connection is expressed by the connection 1-forms, a skew-symmetric r × r matrix of differential 1-forms θ_{α}^{β}. The exterior covariant derivative of s, as a vector-valued differential 3-form, is expressed relative to the local frame by r many differential 3-forms, defined by

$$(d^\nabla s)^\alpha=d(s^\alpha)+\theta_\beta{}^\alpha\wedge s^\beta.$$

In the case of the trivial real line bundle ℝ × M → M with its standard connection, vector-valued differential forms and differential forms can be naturally identified with one another, and each of the above definitions coincides with the standard exterior derivative.

Given a principal bundle, any linear representation of the structure group defines an associated bundle, and any connection on the principal bundle induces a connection on the associated vector bundle. Differential forms valued in the vector bundle may be naturally identified with fully anti-symmetric tensorial forms on the total space of the principal bundle. Under this identification, the notions of exterior covariant derivative for the principal bundle and for the vector bundle coincide with one another.

The curvature of a connection on a vector bundle may be defined as the composition of the two exterior covariant derivatives Ω^{0}(M, E) → Ω^{1}(M, E) and Ω^{1}(M, E) → Ω^{2}(M, E), so that it is defined as a real-linear map F: Ω^{0}(M, E) → Ω^{2}(M, E). It is a fundamental but not immediately apparent fact that F(s)_{p}: T_{p}M × T_{p}M → E_{p} only depends on s(p), and does so linearly. As such, the curvature may be regarded as an element of Ω^{2}(M, End(E)). Depending on how the exterior covariant derivative is formulated, various alternative but equivalent definitions of curvature (some without the language of exterior differentiation) can be obtained.

It is a well-known fact that the composition of the standard exterior derivative with itself is zero: d(dω) = 0. In the present context, this can be regarded as saying that the standard connection on the trivial line bundle ℝ × M → M has zero curvature.

Some equations involving covariant derivative can be locally solved using Chen's iterated integrals or using approach based on linear homotopy operator.

== Example ==
- Bianchi's second identity, which says that the exterior covariant derivative of Ω is zero (that is, DΩ = 0) can be stated as: $d\Omega + \operatorname{ad}(\omega) \cdot \Omega = d\Omega + [\omega \wedge \Omega] = 0$.
