= Glossary of tensor theory =

This is a glossary of tensor theory. For expositions of tensor theory from different points of view, see:

- Tensor
- Tensor (intrinsic definition)
- Application of tensor theory in engineering science

For some history of the abstract theory see also multilinear algebra.

== Classical notation ==
Ricci calculus
The earliest foundation of tensor theory – tensor index notation.

Order of a tensor
The components of a tensor with respect to a basis is an indexed array. The order of a tensor is the number of indices needed. Some texts may refer to the tensor order using the term degree or rank.

Rank of a tensor
The rank of a tensor is the minimum number of rank-one tensor that must be summed to obtain the tensor. A rank-one tensor may be defined as expressible as the outer product of the number of nonzero vectors needed to obtain the correct order.

Dyadic tensor
A dyadic tensor is a tensor of order two, and may be represented as a square matrix. In contrast, a dyad is specifically a dyadic tensor of rank one.

Einstein notation
This notation is based on the understanding that whenever a multidimensional array contains a repeated index letter, the default interpretation is that the product is summed over all permitted values of the index. For example, if a_{ij} is a matrix, then under this convention a_{ii} is its trace. The Einstein convention is widely used in physics and engineering texts, to the extent that if summation is not to be applied, it is normal to note that explicitly.

Kronecker delta

Levi-Civita symbol

Covariant tensor

Contravariant tensor
The classical interpretation is by components. For example, in the differential form a_{i}dx^{i} the components a_{i} are a covariant vector. That means all indices are lower; contravariant means all indices are upper.

Mixed tensor
This refers to any tensor that has both lower and upper indices.

Cartesian tensor
Cartesian tensors are widely used in various branches of continuum mechanics, such as fluid mechanics and elasticity. In classical continuum mechanics, the space of interest is usually 3-dimensional Euclidean space, as is the tangent space at each point. If we restrict the local coordinates to be Cartesian coordinates with the same scale centered at the point of interest, the metric tensor is the Kronecker delta. This means that there is no need to distinguish covariant and contravariant components, and furthermore there is no need to distinguish tensors and tensor densities. All Cartesian-tensor indices are written as subscripts. Cartesian tensors achieve considerable computational simplification at the cost of generality and of some theoretical insight.

Contraction of a tensor

Raising and lowering indices

Symmetric tensor

Antisymmetric tensor

Multiple cross products

== Algebraic notation ==
This avoids the initial use of components, and is distinguished by the explicit use of the tensor product symbol.

Tensor product
If v and w are vectors in vector spaces V and W respectively, then

$$v \otimes w$$

is a tensor in

$$V \otimes W.$$

That is, the ⊗ operation is a binary operation, but it takes values into a fresh space (it is in a strong sense external). The ⊗ operation is a bilinear map; but no other conditions are applied to it.

Pure tensor
A pure tensor of V ⊗ W is one that is of the form v ⊗ w.
It could be written dyadically a^{i}b^{j}, or more accurately a^{i}b^{j} e_{i} ⊗ f_{j}, where the e_{i} are a basis for V and the f_{j} a basis for W. Therefore, unless V and W have the same dimension, the array of components need not be square. Such pure tensors are not generic: if both V and W have dimension greater than 1, there will be tensors that are not pure, and there will be non-linear conditions for a tensor to satisfy, to be pure. For more see Segre embedding.

Tensor algebra
In the tensor algebra T(V) of a vector space V, the operation $\otimes$ becomes a normal (internal) binary operation. A consequence is that T(V) has infinite dimension unless V has dimension 0. The free algebra on a set X is for practical purposes the same as the tensor algebra on the vector space with X as basis.

Hodge star operator

Exterior power

The wedge product is the anti-symmetric form of the ⊗ operation. The quotient space of T(V) on which it becomes an internal operation is the exterior algebra of V; it is a graded algebra, with the graded piece of weight k being called the k-th exterior power of V.

Symmetric power, symmetric algebra
This is the invariant way of constructing polynomial algebras.

== Applications ==
Metric tensor

Strain tensor

Stress–energy tensor

== Tensor field theory ==
Jacobian matrix

Tensor field

Tensor density

Lie derivative

Tensor derivative

Differential geometry

== Abstract algebra ==
Tensor product of fields
This is an operation on fields, that does not always produce a field.

Tensor product of R-algebras

Clifford module
A representation of a Clifford algebra which gives a realisation of a Clifford algebra as a matrix algebra.

Tor functors
These are the derived functors of the tensor product, and feature strongly in homological algebra. The name comes from the torsion subgroup in abelian group theory.

Symbolic method of invariant theory

Derived category

Grothendieck's six operations
These are highly abstract approaches used in some parts of geometry.

== Spinors ==
See:

Spin group

Spin-c group

Spinor

Pin group

Pinors

Spinor field

Killing spinor

Spin manifold

== Books ==
- Bishop, R.L.; Goldberg, S.I. (1968), Tensor Analysis on Manifolds (First Dover 1980 ed.), The Macmillan Company, ISBN 0-486-64039-6
- Danielson, Donald A. (2003). Vectors and Tensors in Engineering and Physics (2/e ed.). Westview (Perseus). ISBN 978-0-8133-4080-7.
- Dimitrienko, Yuriy (2002). Tensor Analysis and Nonlinear Tensor Functions. Kluwer Academic Publishers (Springer). ISBN 1-4020-1015-X.
- Lovelock, David; Hanno Rund (1989) [1975]. Tensors, Differential Forms, and Variational Principles. Dover. ISBN 978-0-486-65840-7.
- Synge, John L; Schild, Alfred (1949). Tensor Calculus. Dover Publications 1978 edition. ISBN 978-0-486-63612-2.
