= Tensor Contraction Engine =

The Tensor Contraction Engine (TCE) is a compiler for a domain-specific language that allows chemists to specify the computation in a high-level Mathematica-style language. It transforms tensor summation expressions to low-level code (C/Fortran) for specific hardware being mindful of memory availability, communication costs, loop fusion and ordering, etc. It is used primarily in computational chemistry.
