= Tensor (intrinsic definition) =

Coordinate-free definition of a tensor

In mathematics, the modern component-free approach to the theory of a tensor views it as an abstract object, expressing some definite type of multilinear concept. Their properties can be derived from their definitions, as linear maps or more generally, and the rules for manipulations of tensors arise as an extension of linear algebra to multilinear algebra. (Note: This article assumes an understanding of the tensor product of vector spaces without chosen bases.)

In differential geometry, an intrinsic geometric statement may be described by a tensor field on a manifold, and then doesn't need to make reference to coordinates at all. The same is true in general relativity, of tensor fields describing a physical property. The component-free approach is also used extensively in abstract algebra and homological algebra, where tensors arise naturally.

== Definition via tensor products of vector spaces ==
Given a finite set {V_{1}, ..., V_{n}} of vector spaces over a common field F, one may form their tensor product V_{1} ⊗ ... ⊗ V_{n}, an element of which is termed a tensor.

A tensor on the vector space V is then defined to be an element of (i.e., a vector in) a vector space of the form:
$$V \otimes \cdots \otimes V \otimes V^* \otimes \cdots \otimes V^*$$
where V^{∗} is the dual space of V.

If there are m copies of V and n copies of V^{∗} in our product, the tensor is said to be of type (m, n) and contravariant of order m and covariant of order n and of total order m + n. The tensors of order zero are just the scalars (elements of the field F), those of contravariant order 1 are the vectors in V, and those of covariant order 1 are the one-forms in V^{∗} (for this reason, the elements of the last two spaces are often called the contravariant and covariant vectors). The space of all tensors of type (m, n) is denoted
$$T^m_n(V) = \underbrace{ V\otimes \dots \otimes V}_{m} \otimes \underbrace{ V^*\otimes \dots \otimes V^*}_{n}.$$

Example 1. When $V$ is finite-dimensional, the space of type (1, 1) tensors, $T^1_1(V) = V \otimes V^*,$ is isomorphic in a natural way to the space of linear transformations from V to V.

Example 2. When $V$ is finite-dimensional, a bilinear form on a real vector space V, $V\times V \to F,$ corresponds in a natural way to a type (0, 2) tensor in $T^0_2 (V) = V^* \otimes V^*.$ An example of such a bilinear form may be defined, termed the associated metric tensor, and is usually denoted g.

== Tensor rank ==
The term rank of a tensor extends the notion of the rank of a matrix in linear algebra, although the term is also often used to mean the order (or degree) of a tensor. The rank of a matrix is the minimum number of column vectors needed to span the range of the matrix. A matrix thus has rank one if it can be written as an outer product of two nonzero vectors:
$$A = v w^{\mathrm{T}}.$$
The rank of a matrix $A$ is the minimum number of rank one matrices that sum to $A$:
$$A = v_1w_1^\mathrm{T} + \cdots + v_k w_k^\mathrm{T}.$$

A simple tensor (also called a tensor of rank one, elementary tensor or decomposable tensor) is a tensor that can be written as a product of tensors of the form
$$T=a\otimes b\otimes\cdots\otimes d$$
where a, b, ..., d are nonzero and in V or V^{∗} – that is, if the tensor is nonzero and completely factorizable. Every tensor can be expressed as a sum of simple tensors. The rank of a tensor T is the minimum number of simple tensors that sum to T.

The zero tensor has rank zero. A nonzero order 0 or 1 tensor always has rank 1. The rank of a non-zero order 2 or higher tensor is less than or equal to the product of the dimensions of all but the highest-dimensioned vectors in (a sum of products of) which the tensor can be expressed, which is d^{n−1} when each product is of n vectors from a finite-dimensional vector space of dimension d.

In indices, a tensor of rank 1 is a tensor of the form
$$T_{ij\dots}^{k\ell\dots}=a_i b_j \cdots c^k d^\ell\cdots.$$

The rank of a tensor of order 2 agrees with the rank when the tensor is regarded as a matrix, and can be determined from Gaussian elimination for instance. The rank of an order 3 or higher tensor is however often very difficult to determine, and low rank decompositions of tensors are sometimes of great practical interest. In fact, the problem of finding the rank of an order 3 tensor over any finite field is NP-Complete, and over the rationals, is NP-Hard. Computational tasks such as the efficient multiplication of matrices and the efficient evaluation of polynomials can be recast as the problem of simultaneously evaluating a set of bilinear forms
$$z_k = \sum_{ij} T_{ijk}x_iy_j$$
for given inputs x_{i} and y_{j}. If a low-rank decomposition of the tensor T is known, then an efficient evaluation strategy is known.

== Universal property ==
The space $T^m_n(V)$ can be characterized by a universal property in terms of multilinear mappings. Amongst the advantages of this approach are that it gives a way to show that many linear mappings are "natural" or "geometric" (in other words are independent of any choice of basis). Explicit computational information can then be written down using bases, and this order of priorities can be more convenient than proving a formula gives rise to a natural mapping. Another aspect is that tensor products are not used only for free modules, and the "universal" approach carries over more easily to more general situations.

A scalar-valued function on a Cartesian product (or direct sum) of vector spaces
$$f : V_1\times\cdots\times V_N \to F$$
is multilinear if it is linear in each argument. The space of all multilinear mappings from V_{1} × ... × V_{N} to W is denoted L^{N}(V_{1}, ..., V_{N}; W). When N = 1, a multilinear mapping is just an ordinary linear mapping, and the space of all linear mappings from V to W is denoted L(V; W).

The universal characterization of the tensor product implies that, for each multilinear function
$$f\in L^{m+n}(\underbrace{V^*,\ldots,V^*}_m,\underbrace{V,\ldots,V}_n;W)$$
(where W can represent the field of scalars, a vector space, or a tensor space) there exists a unique linear function
$$T_f \in L(\underbrace{V^*\otimes\cdots\otimes V^*}_m \otimes \underbrace{V\otimes\cdots\otimes V}_n; W)$$
such that
$$f(\alpha_1,\ldots,\alpha_m, v_1,\ldots,v_n) = T_f(\alpha_1\otimes\cdots\otimes\alpha_m \otimes v_1\otimes\cdots\otimes v_n)$$
for all v_{i} in V and α_{i} in V^{∗}.

Using the universal property, it follows, when V is finite dimensional, that the space of (m, n)-tensors admits a natural isomorphism
$$T^m_n(V) \cong L(\underbrace{V^* \otimes \cdots \otimes V^*}_m \otimes \underbrace{V \otimes \cdots \otimes V}_n; F) \cong L^{m+n}(\underbrace{V^*, \ldots,V^*}_m,\underbrace{V,\ldots,V}_n; F).$$

Each V in the definition of the tensor corresponds to a V^{∗} inside the argument of the linear maps, and vice versa. (Note that in the former case, there are m copies of V and n copies of V^{∗}, and in the latter case vice versa). In particular, one has
$$\begin{align}
T^1_0(V) &\cong L(V^*;F) \cong V,\\
T^0_1(V) &\cong L(V;F) = V^*,\\
T^1_1(V) &\cong L(V;V).
\end{align}$$

== Tensor fields ==
Differential geometry, physics and engineering must often deal with tensor fields on smooth manifolds. The term tensor is sometimes used as a shorthand for tensor field. A tensor field expresses the concept of a tensor that varies from point to point on the manifold.
