= Alberto Sesana =

Italian astrophysicist

- Citizenship: Italian
- Education: Università dell'Insubria (Laurea, 2003; PhD, 2007)
- Known for: Gravitational wave background modeling from supermassive black hole binaries; Multi-band gravitational wave astronomy; Pulsar timing array science
- Awards: Royal Society University Research Fellowship (2014); ERC Consolidator Grant (2018); ERC Advanced Grant (2024)
- Scientific career
- Fields: Astrophysics, gravitational wave astronomy
- Workplaces: University of Milano-Bicocca; University of Birmingham; Max Planck Institute for Gravitational Physics; Penn State University

Alberto Sesana is an Italian theoretical astrophysicist and Full Professor of Astrophysics at the University of Milano-Bicocca. His research focuses on the formation and evolution of supermassive black hole binaries and the modeling of astrophysical sources of gravitational waves. He is known for foundational theoretical work on the gravitational wave background from supermassive black hole binaries in the pulsar timing array frequency band, as well as for pioneering the concept of multi-band gravitational wave astronomy. He is a member of the European Pulsar Timing Array (EPTA), the International Pulsar Timing Array (IPTA), and the LISA Consortium, the LISA Science Team (LST), and the LISA Distributed Data Processing Center (DDPC).

== Education and early career ==
Sesana received his Laurea from the Università dell'Insubria in 2003 and his PhD in Physics and Astrophysics from the same institution in 2007. He subsequently held postdoctoral positions at the University of Birmingham (2007), Penn State University (2008–2009), and the Max Planck Institute for Gravitational Physics (Albert Einstein Institute) in Potsdam, Germany (2009–2015).

== Career ==
In 2014, Sesana was awarded a University Research Fellowship from the Royal Society for work on gravitational wave detection with pulsar timing arrays, returning to the University of Birmingham, where he was appointed Senior Lecturer in 2017.

In 2018, he received a European Research Council (ERC) Consolidator Grant to fund the B Massive project (Binary Massive Black Hole Astrophysics) at the University of Milano-Bicocca, where he took up an Associate Professor position in 2019. He was promoted to Full Professor (Professore Ordinario) in 2022. In 2024, he was awarded an ERC Advanced Grant to fund the PINGU project (Pulsar timing array Inference of the NanoHz Gravitational-wave Universe).

== Research ==
Sesana's research centers on modeling astrophysical sources of gravitational waves, with emphasis on supermassive black hole binaries (SMBHBs). His work spans the gravitational wave spectrum from the nanohertz band accessible to pulsar timing arrays to the millihertz band targeted by LISA.

=== Pulsar timing arrays ===
Sesana's work on the gravitational wave background (GWB) from supermassive black hole binary populations has been foundational to the field of pulsar timing array science. In 2008, Sesana, Vecchio and Colacino carried out the first systematic study of the stochastic GWB generated by the cosmic population of massive black hole binaries across a wide range of assembly scenarios, establishing that the characteristic strain amplitude at 10^{−8} Hz was robust to within a factor of a few regardless of the specific formation model. In 2013, he extended this work by performing the first systematic investigation of the expected GWB signal using observationally based galaxy merger rates and empirical black hole–host galaxy relations to bracket the range of signal amplitudes consistent with observations of SMBH assembly at low redshift. These models became standard benchmarks against which PTA upper limits and, ultimately, detections were compared.

Sesana is a member of the European Pulsar Timing Array (EPTA), where he serves on the Steering Committee, and served as Chair of the International Pulsar Timing Array (IPTA) in 2016. He contributed to the EPTA's second data release, which presented evidence for a stochastic gravitational wave background consistent with a population of inspiralling SMBHBs.

=== Multi-band gravitational wave astronomy ===
In 2016, following LIGO's first detection of gravitational waves (GW150914), Sesana published "The promise of multi-band gravitational wave astronomy" in Physical Review Letters. The paper demonstrated that the black hole binary coalescence rates inferred from LIGO implied a loud gravitational wave sky at millihertz frequencies accessible to LISA. Sesana showed that LISA could observe stellar-mass black hole binaries years before their merger, providing advance warning to ground-based detectors. This work helped establish multi-band gravitational wave astronomy as a science case for the LISA mission.

=== LISA ===
Sesana is a member of the LISA Consortium, where he coordinated the Science Interpretation Work Package (SIWP). He is also a member of the LISA Science Team, appointed by ESA to supervise the scientific development of the LISA mission, and deputy scientist of the LISA Distributed Data Processing Center (DDPC), preparing the analysis of future data provided by the LISA spacecraft.

=== Other contributions ===
His broader research interests include extreme mass ratio inspirals (EMRIs), stellar dynamics in dense stellar systems, tidal disruption events, and the co-evolution of massive black holes and their host galaxies.

== Selected publications ==
- Sesana, Alberto; Vecchio, Alberto; Colacino, Carlo Nicola (2008). "The stochastic gravitational-wave background from massive black hole binary systems: implications for observations with Pulsar Timing Arrays". Monthly Notices of the Royal Astronomical Society. 390 (1): 192–209. arXiv:0804.4476. Bibcode:2008MNRAS.390..192S. doi:10.1111/j.1365-2966.2008.13682.x.
- Sesana, Alberto (2013). "Systematic investigation of the expected gravitational wave signal from supermassive black hole binaries in the pulsar timing band". Monthly Notices of the Royal Astronomical Society: Letters. 433 (1): L1–L5. arXiv:1211.5375. Bibcode:2013MNRAS.433L...1S. doi:10.1093/mnrasl/slt034.
- Sesana, Alberto (2013). "Gravitational wave emission from binary supermassive black holes". Classical and Quantum Gravity. 30 (22) 224014. arXiv:1307.4086. doi:10.1088/0264-9381/30/22/224014.
- Sesana, Alberto (2016). "The promise of multi-band gravitational wave astronomy". Physical Review Letters. 116 (23) 231102. arXiv:1602.06951. Bibcode:2016PhRvL.116w1102S. doi:10.1103/PhysRevLett.116.231102. PMID 27341222.
- Babak, Stanislav; Petiteau, Antoine; Sesana, Alberto (2016). "European Pulsar Timing Array limits on continuous gravitational waves from individual supermassive black hole binaries". Monthly Notices of the Royal Astronomical Society. 455 (2): 1665–1679. arXiv:1509.02165. doi:10.1093/mnras/stv2092.
- Colpi, Monica; Sesana, Alberto (2017). "Gravitational wave sources in the era of multi-band gravitational wave astronomy". An Overview of Gravitational Waves. World Scientific. pp. 43–140. arXiv:1610.05309. doi:10.1142/9789813141766_0002. ISBN 978-981-314-175-9.

== Honours and awards ==
- Royal Society University Research Fellowship (2014)
- European Research Council Consolidator Grant (2018)
- European Research Council Advanced Grant (2024)
- Chair, International Pulsar Timing Array (2016)
