= Xavier Siemens =

Spanish-American astrophysicist

- Born: Madrid, Spain
- Citizenship: Spain; United States
- Education: Tufts University (PhD); Imperial College London (BSc, MSc)
- Known for: Gravitational wave background LIGO calibration
- Awards: Bruno Rossi Prize (2025); Fellow of the American Physical Society (2024); ICBS Frontiers of Science Award (2024)
- Scientific career
- Fields: Astrophysics, gravitational-wave astronomy
- Workplaces: Oregon State University; University of Wisconsin–Milwaukee; California Institute of Technology
- Doctoral advisor: Alexander Vilenkin

Xavier Siemens is a Spanish-American astrophysicist and professor of physics at Oregon State University. He is co-director of the NANOGrav Physics Frontiers Center and is known for his contributions to gravitational wave astronomy, particularly in pulsar timing array science and the calibration of LIGO data. In 2023, he co-led the NANOGrav collaboration's announcement of evidence for a gravitational wave background at nanohertz frequencies.

== Early life and education ==
Siemens was born in Madrid, Spain. He received his BSc and MSc in physics from Imperial College London in 1995. He completed his PhD in physics at Tufts University in 2002 under the supervision of Alexander Vilenkin, with his doctoral research focusing on cosmic strings and their gravitational wave signatures.

== Career ==
After completing his PhD, Siemens held a postdoctoral position at the University of Wisconsin–Milwaukee (UWM) from 2002 to 2006, where he joined the LIGO Scientific Collaboration and became co-chair of its Calibration Team. He then spent a year as a Senior Postdoctoral Scholar at the California Institute of Technology. In 2007, he returned to UWM as a faculty member, reaching the rank of associate professor in 2011.

Siemens joined Oregon State University as a professor of physics in May 2019.

=== NANOGrav ===
Siemens has been involved in the development of NANOGrav (the North American Nanohertz Observatory for Gravitational Waves). Together with Maura McLaughlin, he became co-director of the collaboration when it was designated a National Science Foundation Physics Frontiers Center in 2015, supported by a $14.5 million grant. Under their leadership, NANOGrav secured a $17 million NSF grant renewal in 2021 to continue its search for gravitational waves using the Green Bank Telescope, the Very Large Array, and the Arecibo Observatory.

In June 2023, NANOGrav announced evidence for a gravitational-wave background at nanohertz frequencies, consistent with the signal expected from a population of supermassive black hole binaries across the universe. The result was published simultaneously with corroborating findings from the European Pulsar Timing Array, the Parkes Pulsar Timing Array, and the Chinese Pulsar Timing Array. Siemens's group at Oregon State contributed to the analysis through Bayesian model comparison and noise characterization methods.

=== LIGO calibration ===
Siemens made contributions to the calibration of LIGO interferometric data, developing time-domain methods for converting raw detector readout into calibrated gravitational-wave strain, h(t). His American Physical Society Fellowship citation recognized this work alongside his pulsar timing array contributions.

=== Cosmic strings ===
Siemens's early research focused on the gravitational wave signatures of cosmic string networks. He assessed the accessibility of the stochastic gravitational-wave background produced by cosmic strings to current and planned detectors, including LIGO, LISA, and pulsar timing arrays. He also led LIGO's first search for gravitational-wave bursts from cosmic strings.

== Awards and honours ==
- 2024 – International Congress of Basic Science Frontiers of Science Award in Astrophysics and Cosmology, shared with the NANOGrav collaboration for the 15-year gravitational-wave background paper
- 2024 – Fellow of the American Physical Society, for "foundational contributions to low-frequency gravitational wave detection using pulsar arrays and his pioneering work in developing methods to calibrate the strain for ground-based interferometers"
- 2025 – Bruno Rossi Prize, shared with Maura McLaughlin and the NANOGrav collaboration, "for finding evidence of the stochastic gravitational wave background, the first direct indication of the existence of binary supermassive black holes"

== Selected publications ==
- "The NANOGrav 15 yr Data Set: Evidence for a Gravitational-wave Background". The Astrophysical Journal Letters. 951 (1): L8. 2023. arXiv:2306.16213. doi:10.3847/2041-8213/acdac6.
- Siemens, X.; Mandic, V.; Creighton, J. (2007). "Gravitational-Wave Stochastic Background from Cosmic Strings". Physical Review Letters. 98 111101. arXiv:astro-ph/0610920. doi:10.1103/PhysRevLett.98.111101.
- Siemens, X.; Allen, B.; Creighton, J.; Hewitson, M.; Landry, M. (2004). "Making h(t) for LIGO". Classical and Quantum Gravity. 21: S1723–S1735. arXiv:gr-qc/0405070. doi:10.1088/0264-9381/21/20/015.
