= Steven Detweiler =

American theoretical astrophysicist

Steven Lawrence Detweiler
- Born: Yonkers, New York
- Died: February 8, 2016
- Education: Princeton University (B.A. 1969); University of Chicago (Ph.D. 1976)
- Known for: Gravitational waves Black holes Pulsar timing array
- Awards: Fellowship of the American Physical Society
- Scientific career
- Fields: Theoretical physics
- Workplaces: University of Florida
- Doctoral advisor: James R. Ipser

Steven L. Detweiler was a theoretical physicist and professor of physics at the University of Florida best known for proposing pulsar timing arrays as a means to detect gravitational waves, an idea that led to the discovery of a stochastic gravitational wave background in 2023.

== Life ==
Detweiler was born in Yonkers, New York the son of Joseph Hall Detweiler and Catherine Lawrence Detweiler. He received his bachelor's degree from Princeton University in 1969. For his Ph.D. he went to the University of Chicago to work under the supervision of James R. Ipser, where he received his doctorate in theoretical physics in 1976 After obtaining his PhD, Detweiler had postdoctoral fellowships at the University of Maryland (1974-1976) and the California Institute of Technology (1976-1977), before he obtained an assistant professor position at Yale University in 1977. In 1982, he moved to the University of Florida in Gainesville, where he became full professor and spent the rest of his career.

Detweiler was an avid marathon runner, having completed the Boston marathon in a time of 3:43:21 the year before his death at an age of 67. On February 8, 2016, Detweiler died suddenly after he collapsed during his morning run.

Detweiler had two children a daughter, Catherine (Kate) Seibert Detweiler and son, David Logan Detweiler.

== Scientific Legacy ==
Detweiler's research focused on the dynamics of stars and black holes, as well as on the production and observation of gravitational waves.

=== Pulsar Timing Arrays ===
In 1979, Detweiler proposed the use of the collective observations of an array of pulsars to detect gravitational waves waves with wavelengths on the scale of light-years. This built upon an earlier proposal by Mikhail Sazhin to use individual pulsars. Today, this idea is known as a pulsar timing array. The idea was first taken up experimentally by Foster and Backer in 1990, and today globally there are five active pulsar timing array experiments. In 2023, this idea led to the discovery of a stochastic gravitational wave background by the NANOGrav experiment and other pulsar timing array experiments.

=== Black hole spectroscopy ===
In 1975 together with Subrahmanyan Chandrasekhar, Detweiler calculated the characteristic frequencies with which perturbations oscillate around a Schwarzschild black hole. Unlike the normal modes of stars, the oscillations of a black hole decay exponentially, which is why they are called quasinormal modes. The quasinormal mode spectrum of a black hole is uniquely determined by its mass, span, and (possibly) charge. Observation of the quasinormal mode spectrum of black hole therefore allows the identification of its parameters and possible deviations from the predictions of general relativity. This has blossomed into an active field of research known as black hole spectroscopy.

=== Detweiler--Whiting singular field ===
In the early 2000s, Detweiler started working on the gravitational self-force formalism. One of his key contributions to the field was, together with Bernard Whiting a novel decomposition of the Green's function for linear metric perturbations on a curved background into a singular piece that solved the linearized Einstein equation with a point source, and a regular piece that solved the vacuum linearized Einstein equation and is responsible for the gravitational self-force back-reaction of the field on the particle generating it. This regular-singular split of the Green's function makes explicit how the equivalence principle manifests for systems involving radiation reaction. The Detweiler--Whiting regular--singular split, as it is commonly known, plays a keystone role in modern methods calculating the gravitational self-force.

=== Detweiler redshift invariant ===
Calculations of the dynamics of binary black holes, notoriously depend on various coordinate gauge choices made in the calculation. This forms a serious complication when trying to compare results produced through different methods. Such comparisons typically require the calculation of gauge invariant quantities. In 2008, Detweiler introduced a new such invariant based on the redshift experienced in the regular part of his regular-singular split. This Detweiler redshift invariant, as it is known, has played a key role in performing comparisons between different formalisms for solving the relativistic two body problem, such as post-Newtonian theory and gravitational self-force. For example, it is through comparisons of the Detweiler redshift between post-Newtonian and gravitational self-force calculations that it was revealed that there could be conservative contributions to the post-Newtonian dynamics at odd powers of the relative velocity. Moreover, the Detweiler redshift features centrally in the first law of black hole binary mechanics. This relationship has proven key in incorporating gravitational self-force results in effective one-body waveform models.

== Recognition ==
In 2013, he was elected to a fellowship of the American Physical Society in recognition of his many and varied contributions to gravitational physics. After his death in 2016, the 19th Capra Meeting on Radiation Reaction in General Relativity was dedicated to his memory.
