= Sarah Vigeland =

American physicist and professor

- Born: Sarah Jane Vigeland
- Education: University of Wisconsin–Milwaukee
- Scientific career
- Fields: Gravitational waves Neutron stars Black holes
- Workplaces: Carleton College (BA); Massachusetts Institute of Technology (PhD)
- Thesis: Studies of strong-field gravity : testing the black hole hypothesis and investigating spin-curvature coupling (2012)
- Doctoral advisor: Scott A. Hughes
- Website: uwm.edu/physics/people/vigeland-sarah

Sarah Jane Vigeland is an American physicist who is a professor at the University of Wisconsin–Milwaukee. She uses pulsar timing arrays to study the low-frequency gravitational waves from supermassive black holes.

== Early life and education ==
Vigeland studied physics at Carleton College where she graduated with a Bachelor of Arts degree. She was a doctoral researcher at Massachusetts Institute of Technology, where she studied strong-field gravity and spin-curvature coupling supervised by Scott A. Hughes.

== Research and career ==
Vigeland is interested in black holes and techniques for detecting gravitational waves. Her early work considered high frequency gravitational waves, which she studied at the Laser Interferometer Gravitational-Wave Observatory LIGO. In 2013, Vigeland became involved with the North American Nanohertz Observatory for Gravitational Waves (NANOGrav), an American collaborative effort to search for gravitational waves. She secured a $17m grant to support the development and sensitivity of the Green Bank Telescope, Very Large Array and Canadian Hydrogen Intensity Mapping Experiment.

In 2023, Vigeland's team at the University of Wisconsin–Milwaukee announced their discover of a low frequency (nanohertz) "background hum" of gravitational waves across the universe. Their announcement was the result of fifteen years of observational astrophysics. The low frequency waves originate from supermassive black holes. Black holes at the centres of galaxies merge, triggering ripples of gravitational waves that propagate through the universe. The growth and evolution of black holes are related to the growth and evolution of host galaxies.

To detect low frequency gravitational waves in the form of the stochastic gravitational wave background, Vigeland uses pulsar timing arrays. These look for correlations in the timing residuals of collections of rapidly spinning, millisecond pulsars. These ultrastable pulsars are the most precise astrophysical clocks in the universe. Vigeland is a keynote speaker at the American Physical Society Global Physics Summit.

=== Selected publications ===
Her publications include:

- Evidence for alignment of the rotation and velocity vectors in pulsars
- The fingerprint of a cosmos swirling with gravitational waves
- Bumpy black holes in alternative theories of gravity
