= Pulsar timing array =

Gravitational-wave astronomy technique

A pulsar timing array (PTA) is a set of galactic pulsars that is monitored and analyzed to search for correlated signatures in the pulse arrival times on Earth. As such, they are galactic-sized detectors. Although there are many applications for pulsar timing arrays, the best known is the use of an array of millisecond pulsars to detect and analyse long-wavelength (i.e., low-frequency) gravitational wave background. Such a detection would entail a detailed measurement of a gravitational wave (GW) signature, like the GW-induced quadrupolar correlation between arrival times of pulses emitted by different millisecond pulsar pairings that depends only on the pairings' angular separations in the sky. Larger arrays may be better for GW detection because the quadrupolar spatial correlations induced by GWs can be better sampled by many more pulsar pairings. With such a GW detection, millisecond pulsar timing arrays would open a new low-frequency window in gravitational-wave astronomy to peer into potential ancient astrophysical sources and early Universe processes, inaccessible by any other means.

== Overview ==
The pulsars P1 ... Pn are sending signals periodically, which are received on Earth. A gravitational wave (GW) perturbs spacetime in between the pulsar and Earth (E) and changes the time of arrival of the pulses. By measuring the spatial correlation of the changes in the pulse parameters of many different pulsar pairings, a GW can be detected.

The proposal to use pulsars as gravitational wave (GW) detectors was originally made by Mikhail Sazhin and Steven Detweiler in the late 1970s. The idea is to treat the Solar System barycenter and a galactic pulsar as opposite ends of an imaginary arm in space. The pulsar acts as the reference clock at one end of the arm sending out regular signals which are monitored by an observer on Earth. The effect of a passing long-wavelength GW would be to perturb the galactic spacetime and cause a small change in the observed time of arrival of the pulses.

In 1983, Hellings and Downs extended this idea to an array of pulsars and found that a stochastic background of GWs would produce a distinctive GW signature: a quadrupolar and higher multipolar spatial correlation between arrival times of pulses emitted by different millisecond pulsar pairings that depends only on the pairing's angular separation in the sky as viewed from Earth (more precisely the solar system barycenter). The key property of a pulsar timing array is that the signal from a stochastic GW background will be correlated across the sightlines of pulsar pairs, while that from the other noise processes will not. In the literature, this spatial correlation curve is called the Hellings-Downs curve or the overlap reduction function.

The Hellings and Downs work was limited in sensitivity by the precision and stability of the pulsar clocks in the array. Following the discovery of the more stable millisecond pulsar in 1982, Foster and Backer improved the sensitivity to GWs by applying in 1990 the Hellings-Downs analysis to an array of highly stable millisecond pulsars and initiated a 'pulsar timing array program' to observe three pulsars using the National Radio Astronomy Observatory 43 m telescope.

Millisecond pulsars are used because they are not prone to the starquakes and glitches, accretion events or stochastic timing noise which can affect the period of slower classical pulsars. Millisecond pulsars have a stability comparable to atomic-clock-based time standards when averaged over decades.

One influence on these propagation properties are low-frequency GWs, with a frequency of 10^{−9} to 10^{−6} hertz; the most likely astrophysical sources of such GWs are supermassive black hole binaries in the centres of merging galaxies, where tens of millions of solar masses are in orbit with a period between months and a few years.

GWs cause the time of arrival of the pulses to vary by a few tens of nanoseconds over their wavelength (so, for a frequency of 3 × 10^{−8} Hz, one cycle per year, one would find that pulses arrive 20 ns early in July and 20 ns late in January). This is a delicate experiment, although millisecond pulsars are stable enough clocks that the time of arrival of the pulses can be predicted to the required accuracy; the experiments use collections of 20 to 50 pulsars to account for dispersion effects in the atmosphere and in the space between the observer and the pulsar. It is necessary to monitor each pulsar roughly once a week; a higher cadence of observation would allow the detection of higher-frequency GWs, but it is unclear whether there would be loud enough astrophysical sources at such frequencies.

It is not possible to get accurate sky locations for the sources by this method, as analysing timings for twenty pulsars would produce a region of uncertainty of 100 square degrees – a patch of sky about the size of the constellation Scutum which would contain at least thousands of merging galaxies.

The main goal of PTAs is measuring the amplitude of background GWs, possibly caused by a history of supermassive black hole mergers. The amplitudes can describe the history of how galaxies were formed. The bound on the amplitude of the background waves is called an upper limit. The amplitude of the GW background is less than the upper limit.

Some supermassive black hole binaries may form a stable binary and only merge after many times the current age of the universe. This is called the final parsec problem. It is unclear how supermassive black holes approach each other at this distance.

While supermassive black hole binaries are the most likely source of very low frequency GWs, other sources could generate the waves, such as cosmic strings, which may have formed early in the history of the universe. When cosmic strings interact, they can form loops that decay by radiating GWs.

== Active and proposed PTAs ==
Globally there are several active pulsar timing array efforts. The first three projects (PPTA, EPTA, and NANOGrav) have begun collaborating under the title of the International Pulsar Timing Array project, InPTA became a member in 2021. Recently China has also become active although not a full member of IPTA yet. Additionally, there is a gamma-ray pulsar timing array using the Fermi Gamma-ray Space Telescope.

1. The Parkes Pulsar Timing Array (PPTA) at the Parkes radio-telescope has been collecting data since 2005.
2. The European Pulsar Timing Array (EPTA) has been collecting data since 2009; it uses the five largest radio telescopes in Europe:
  - Lovell Telescope
  - Westerbork Synthesis Radio Telescope
  - Effelsberg Telescope
  - Nancay Radio Telescope
  - Sardinia Radio Telescope.
3. The North American Nanohertz Observatory for Gravitational Waves (NANOGrav) uses data, collected since 2005, from the Arecibo and Green Bank radio telescopes.
4. The Indian Pulsar Timing Array (InPTA) uses the upgraded Giant Metrewave Radio Telescope.
5. The Chinese Pulsar Timing Array (CPTA) uses the Five-hundred-meter Aperture Spherical radio Telescope (FAST).
6. The MeerKAT Pulsar Timing Array (MPTA), part of MeerTime, a MeerKAT Large Survey Project. The MPTA aims to precisely measure pulse arrival times from an ensemble of 88 pulsars visible from the Southern hemisphere, with the goal of contributing to the search, detection, and study of nanohertz-frequency gravitational waves as part of the International Pulsar Timing Array.
7. The Gamma-ray Pulsar Timing Array, whose current member is the Fermi Gamma-ray Space Telescope. Proposals exist for significant expansion with future gamma-ray space telescopes to over a thousand pulsars.

== Observations ==
Plot of correlation between pulsars observed by NANOGrav (2023) vs angular separation between pulsars, compared with a theoretical model (dashed purple, or Hellings-Downs curve) and if there were no gravitational wave background (solid green)

In 2020, the NANOGrav collaboration presented the 12.5-year data release, which included strong evidence for a power-law stochastic process with common strain amplitude and spectral index across all pulsars, but statistically inconclusive data for the critical Hellings-Downs quadrupolar spatial correlation.

In June 2023, NANOGrav, EPTA, PPTA, and InPTA announced that they found evidence for a gravitational wave background. NANOGrav's 15-year data on 68 pulsars provided a measurement of the distinctive Hellings-Downs curve, a tell-tale quadrupolar signature of gravitational waves. Simultaneously, similar results were published by European Pulsar Timing Array, who claimed a $3\sigma$-significance, the standard for evidence. They expect that a $5\sigma$-significance, the standard for detection, would be achieved around 2025 by combining the measurements of several collaborations. Also in June 2023, the Chinese Pulsar Timing Array (CPTA) reported similar findings with a $4.6\sigma$-significance; they monitored 57 millisecond pulsars over just 41 months, taking advantage of the high sensitivity of FAST, the world's largest radio telescope. Four independent collaborations reporting similar results provided cross validation of the evidence for GWB using different telescopes, different arrays of pulsars, and different analysis methods. The sources of the gravitational-wave background can not be identified without further observations and analyses, although binaries of supermassive black holes are leading candidates.

== See also ==
- Gravitational-wave observatory
