= International Pulsar Timing Array =

Europe-US-Canada-India-Australian radio astronomy and cosmology collaboration

The International Pulsar Timing Array (IPTA) is a multi-institutional, multi-telescope collaboration of pulsar timing arrays (PTAs). It comprises the European Pulsar Timing Array (EPTA), the North American Nanohertz Observatory for Gravitational Waves (NANOGrav), the Parkes Pulsar Timing Array (PPTA) in Australia, the Indian Pulsar Timing Array Project (InPTA), the Chinese Pulsar Timing Array (CPTA), the Meerkat Pulsar Timing Array (MPTA), and African Pulsar Timing (APT). The goal of the IPTA is to detect ultra-low-frequency gravitational waves, such as from mergers of supermassive black holes, using an array of over 100 pulsars.

== Overview ==
The experiment exploits the predictability of the times of arrival (TOAs) of pulses from millisecond pulsars (MSPs) and uses them as a system of galactic clocks. Disturbances in the clocks will be measurable at the Earth. A disturbance from a gravitational wave background will have a particular signature across the ensemble of pulsars called the Hellings & Downs correlation for which multiple PTAs have strong evidence.

The experiment is analogous to ground-based interferometric detectors such as LIGO and VIRGO, where the time of flight of a laser beam is measured along a particular path and compared to the time of flight along an orthogonally oriented path. Instead of the time of flight of a laser beam, the IPTA is measuring the time of flight of an electromagnetic pulse from the pulsar. Instead of 4 km arms, as in the case of LIGO, the 'arms' of the IPTA are thousands of light-years - the distance between the pulsars and the Earth.

These differences between the IPTA and the ground-based interferometers allow them to probe a completely different range of gravitational-wave frequencies and thus a different sources. Whereas ground-based detectors are sensitive to between tens and thousands of Hz, the IPTA is sensitive to between tens and hundreds of nanohertz. The primary source of gravitational waves in this range is expected to be binary mergers of supermassive black holes with billions of solar masses, thought to be abundant in the universe at the centers of galaxies, resulting from previous mergers of those galaxies.

The resources of the IPTA are substantial. The EPTA uses large quantities of time on Europe's five 100-meter class telescopes: the Lovell Telescope in England, the Effelsberg 100-m Radio Telescope in Germany, the Sardinia Radio Telescope in Italy, the Westerbork Synthesis Radio Telescope in the Netherlands, and the Nançay Radio Telescope in France. Together these five telescopes make up the Large European Array for Pulsars (LEAP), in which they operate together as a single 300-meter class telescope. NANOGrav uses about 1 day per month of time at the 100 m Green Bank Telescope, and prior to its collapse, 0.5 days per month at the 300 m Arecibo Observatory in Puerto Rico. The PPTA uses several days per month at the 64 m Parkes Radio Telescope in Australia.

Pulsar timing was tied for top ranking in the "medium size" category for priorities from the Particle Astrophysics and Gravitational Panel of the Astro2010 Decadal Review sponsored by the U.S. National Academy of Sciences.

The IPTA is coordinated and advised by the IPTA Steering Committee, a seven-member committee with two representatives from each of the three IPTA consortium members plus the immediate past chair. Currently on the committee are Richard Manchester (current chair; CSIRO Astronomy and Space Science; PPTA), Willem van Straten (Swinburne University of Technology; PPTA), Scott Ransom (National Radio Astronomy Observatory; NANOGrav), Ingrid Stairs (University of British Columbia; NANOGrav), Ben Stappers (Jodrell Bank Centre for Astrophysics; EPTA), Gilles Theureau (University of Orléans; EPTA), and Andrea Lommen (past chair; Franklin & Marshall College). Each of the three consortium members are also members of the Gravitational Wave International Committee, an advisory council consisting of the leaders of gravitational wave experiments worldwide.

== Data release ==
- The first IPTA data release was on the 12 February 2016, which provided a 2-sigma limit on the amplitude of the Gravitational Wave Background.
- The second data release, on 10 September 2019, resulted in the detection of the expected red noise background but not of any supermassive black hole mergers.
