= SDSS J0927+2943 =

Unusual quasar

SDSS J092712.65+294344.0
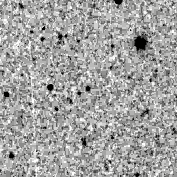

Observation data (Epoch J2000)
- Right ascension: 09^{h} 24^{m} 15.0^{s}
- Declination: −29° 56′ 37″
- Redshift: 0.71279
- Distance: 2860
- Type: QSO

Other designations
- GALEX 2736968124182037807, USNO-A2.0 1125-05901151, SDSS J0927+2943, SDSS J092712.65+294344.0

SDSS J0927+2943 (SDSS J092712.65+294344.0) is an unusual quasar. It exhibits two sets of optical emission lines with different redshifts. The origin of the two emission line systems is believed to be a gravitational wave recoil event: the ejection of a supermassive black hole from the center of the host galaxy. In this interpretation, one of the emission line systems originates in gas that is bound to the black hole, while the other set is associated with gas that remains in the galaxy.

== Evidence for a recoiling black hole ==
A team led by Stefanie Komossa of the Max Planck Institute for Extraterrestrial Physics carried out the analysis. Two systems of strong emission lines were identified in the optical spectrum of this quasar. The first, or "red", system consists of narrow lines of [O III] and other ionized elements at a redshift of z=0.712. Such lines are normally associated with gas far from the center of a galaxy, which is being excited by emission from the central quasar. The second, or "blue", system consists of broad emission lines, the kind that are generally associated with hot gas very close to the supermassive black hole; these lines are at a redshift of 0.697. The velocity difference between the two emission line systems is 2650 km/s.

This puzzling observation is most naturally explained if the black hole was ejected from the nucleus of the galaxy, carrying with it the broad-line gas while leaving behind the bulk of the narrow-line gas. Such ejection is possible, if the black hole formed recently from the merger of two, smaller black holes. The merger is accompanied by the emission of gravitational waves, which can be emitted anisotropically, imparting linear momentum to the merger remnant - in effect, "kicking" the black hole out of the galaxy.

This discovery is important because it indirectly proves that black holes merge and that the mergers can be accompanied by large kicks. This process had been postulated by theory, but never before confirmed via direct observation.

== See also ==
- Naked quasar
