= Gravitational wave background =

Random background of gravitational waves permeating the Universe

The gravitational wave background (also GWB and stochastic background) is a random background of gravitational waves permeating the Universe, which is detectable by gravitational-wave experiments, like pulsar timing arrays. The signal may be intrinsically random, due to stochastic processes in the early Universe and the relic gravitational waves produced directly by cosmic inflation, or it may be produced by an incoherent superposition of a large number of weak independent unresolved gravitational-wave sources, such as supermassive black-hole binaries. Detecting the gravitational wave background can provide information that is inaccessible by any other means about astrophysical source population, like hypothetical ancient supermassive black-hole binaries, and early Universe processes, like hypothetical primordial inflation and cosmic strings.

== Sources of a stochastic background ==
Several potential sources for the background are hypothesized across various frequency bands of interest, with each source producing a background with different statistical properties. The sources of the stochastic background can be broadly divided into two categories: cosmological sources, and astrophysical sources.

=== Cosmological sources ===
Cosmological backgrounds may arise from several early universe sources. There have been ongoing efforts to detect relic gravitational waves originating directly from inflation. Some examples of these primordial sources include time-varying inflationary scalar fields in the early universe, "preheating" mechanisms after inflation involving energy transfer from inflaton particles to regular matter, cosmological phase transitions in the early universe (such as the electroweak phase transition), cosmic strings, etc. While these sources are more hypothetical, a detection of a primordial gravitational wave background from them would be a major discovery of new physics and would have a profound impact on early-universe cosmology and on high-energy physics.

=== Astrophysical sources ===
An astrophysical background is produced by the combined noise of many weak, independent, and unresolved astrophysical sources. For instance, the astrophysical background from stellar mass binary black-hole mergers is expected to be a key source of the stochastic background for the current generation of ground based gravitational-wave detectors. LIGO and Virgo detectors have already detected individual gravitational-wave events from such black-hole mergers. However, there would be a large population of such mergers which would not be individually resolvable which would produce a hum of random looking noise in the detectors. Other astrophysical sources which are not individually resolvable can also form a background. For instance, a sufficiently massive star at the final stage of its evolution will collapse to form either a black hole or a neutron star—in the rapid collapse during the final moments of an explosive supernova event, which can lead to such formations, gravitational waves may theoretically be liberated. Also, in rapidly rotating neutron stars there is a whole class of instabilities driven by the emission of gravitational waves.

The nature of source also depends on the sensitive frequency band of the signal. The current generation of ground based experiments like LIGO and Virgo are sensitive to gravitational-waves in the audio frequency band between approximately 10 Hz to 1000 Hz. In this band the most likely source of the stochastic background will be an astrophysical background from binary neutron-star and stellar mass binary black-hole mergers.

An alternative means of observation is using pulsar timing arrays (PTAs). Three consortia—the European Pulsar Timing Array (EPTA), the North American Nanohertz Observatory for Gravitational Waves (NANOGrav), and the Parkes Pulsar Timing Array (PPTA)—coordinate as the International Pulsar Timing Array. They use radio telescopes to monitor the galactic array of millisecond pulsars, which form a galactic-scale detector sensitive to gravitational waves with low frequencies in the nanohertz to 100 nanohertz range. With existing telescopes, many years of observation are needed to detect a signal, and detector sensitivity improves gradually. Sensitivity bounds are approaching those expected for astrophysical sources.

Supermassive black holes with masses of 10^{5}–10^{9} solar masses are found at the centers of galaxies. It is not known which came first, supermassive black holes or galaxies, or how they evolved. When galaxies merge, it is expected that their central supermassive black holes merge too. These supermassive binaries produce potentially the loudest low-frequency gravitational-wave signals; the most massive of them are potential sources of a nanohertz gravitational wave background, which is in principle detectable by PTAs.

== Detection ==
Plot of correlation between pulsars observed by NANOGrav (2023) vs angular separation between pulsars, compared with a theoretical Hellings–Downs model (dashed purple) and if there were no gravitational wave background (solid green)

On 11 February 2016, the LIGO and Virgo collaborations announced the first direct detection and observation of gravitational waves, which took place in September 2015. In this case, two black holes had collided to produce detectable gravitational waves. This is the first step to the potential detection of a GWB.

On 28 June 2023, the North American Nanohertz Observatory for Gravitational Waves collaboration announced evidence for a GWB using observational data from an array of millisecond pulsars. Observations from EPTA, Parkes Observatory and Chinese Pulsar Timing Array (CPTA) were also published on the same day, providing cross validation of the evidence for the GWB using different telescopes and analysis methods. These observations provided the first measurement of the theoretical Hellings-Downs curve, i.e., the quadrupolar and higher multipolar correlation between two pulsars as a function of their angular separation in the sky, which is a telltale sign of the gravitational wave origin of the observed background.

The sources of this gravitational-wave background cannot be identified without further observations and analyses, although binaries of supermassive black holes are leading candidates.

== See also ==
- Cosmic background radiation
- Cosmic microwave background
- Cosmic neutrino background
- Gravitational-wave astronomy
