= Hellings–Downs curve =

Gravitational wave detection tool

Hellings–Downs curve shown in the purple dashed line. The blue points with error bars represent the results from correlating pairs of pulsars. (GWB = gravitational wave background).

The Hellings–Downs curve (also known as the Hellings and Downs curve) is a theoretical tool used to establish the telltale signature that a galactic-scale pulsar timing array has detected gravitational waves, typically of wavelengths λ = 1 to 10 light years. The method entails searching for spatial correlations of the timing residuals from pairs of pulsars and comparing the data with the Hellings–Downs curve. By convention, when the data fit exceeds the standard 5 sigma threshold, the pulsar timing array can declare detection of gravitational waves. More precisely, the Hellings–Downs curve is the expected correlations of the timing residuals from pairs of pulsars as a function of their angular separation on the sky as seen from Earth. This theoretical correlation function assumes Einstein's general relativity and a gravitational wave background that is isotropic.

== Pulsar timing array residuals ==
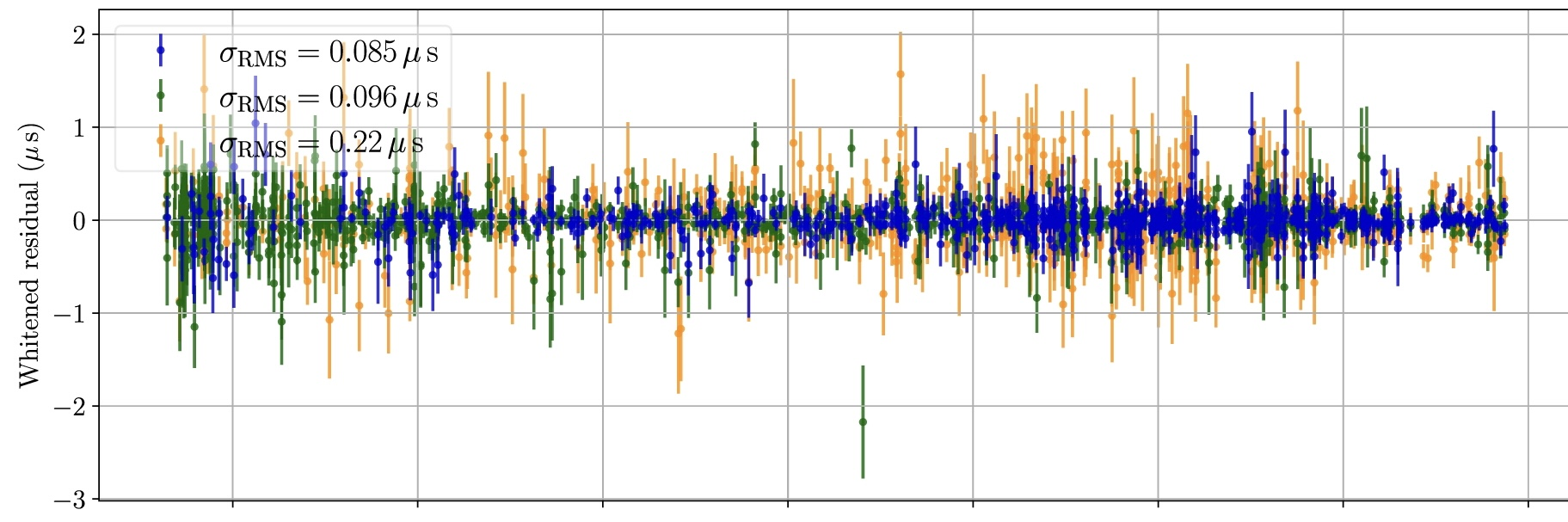
Pulsar timing residuals from the Parkes pulsar timing array. Data has been noise reduced to isolate gravitational wave effects.

Albert Einstein's theory of general relativity predicts that a mass will deform spacetime causing gravitational waves to emanate outward from the source. These gravitational waves will affect the travel time of any light that interacts with them. A pulsar timing residual is the difference between the expected time of arrival and the observed time of arrival of light from pulsars. Because pulsars flash with such a consistent rhythm, it is hypothesised that if a gravitational wave is present, a specific pattern may be observed in the timing residuals from pairs of pulsars. The Hellings–Downs curve is used to infer the presence of gravitational waves by finding patterns of angular correlations in the timing residual data of different pulsar pairings. More precisely, the expected correlations on the vertical axis of the Hellings–Downs curve are the expected values of pulsar-pairs correlations averaged over all pulsar pairs with the same angular separation and over gravitational-wave sources very far away with noninterfering random phases. Pulsar timing residuals are measured using pulsar timing arrays.

== History ==
Not long after the first suggestions of pulsars being used for gravitational wave detection in the late 1970's, Donald Backer discovered the first millisecond pulsar in 1982. The following year Ron Hellings and George Downs published the foundations of the Hellings–Downs curve in their 1983 paper "Upper Limits on the Isotropic Gravitational Radiation Background from Pulsar Timing Analysis". Donald Backer would later go on to become one of the founders of the North American Nanohertz Observatory for Gravitational Waves (NANOGrav).

== Examples in the scientific literature ==
In 2023, NANOGrav used pulsar timing array data collected over 15 years in their latest publications supporting the existence of a gravitational wave background. A total of 2,211 millisecond pulsar pair combinations (67 individual pulsars) were used by the NANOGrav team to construct their Hellings–Downs plot comparison. The NANOGrav team wrote that "The observation of Hellings–Downs correlations points to the gravitational-wave origin of this signal." The Hellings–Downs curve has also been referred to as the "smoking gun" or "fingerprint" of the gravitational-wave background. These examples highlight the critical role that the Hellings–Downs curve plays in contemporary gravitational wave research.

== Equation of the Hellings–Downs curve ==
Reardon et al. (2023) from the Parkes pulsar timing array team give the following equation for the Hellings–Downs curve, which in the literature is also called the overlap reduction function:

$\Gamma_{ab}=\frac{1}{2}\delta_{ab}+\frac{1}{2}-\frac{x_{ab}}{4}+\frac{3}{2}x_{ab}\ln x_{ab}$

where:

$x_{ab}=(1-\cos\zeta_{ab})/2$,

$\delta_{ab}$ is the kronecker delta function,

$\zeta_{ab}$ represents the angle of separation between the two pulsars ${a}$ and ${b}$ as seen from Earth, and

$\Gamma_{ab}$ is the expected angular correlation function.

This curve assumes an isotropic gravitational wave background that obeys Einstein's general relativity. It is valid for "long-arm" detectors like pulsar timing arrays, where the wavelengths of typical gravitational waves are much shorter than the "long-arm" distance between Earth and typical pulsars.
