= Donald C. Backer =

American astrophysicist

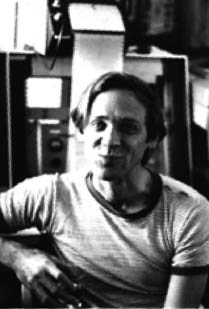
- Born: Donald Charles Backer; November 9, 1943; Plainfield, New Jersey, U.S.
- Died: July 25, 2010 (aged 66); Berkeley, California, U.S.
- Education: Cornell University; University of Manchester
- Scientific career
- Fields: Radio Astronomy,
- Workplaces: UC Berkeley
- Doctoral advisor: Frank Drake

Donald Charles Backer (November 9, 1943 – July 25, 2010) was an American astrophysicist who primarily worked in radio astronomy. Backer made important contributions to the understanding and study of pulsars (including the discovery of the first millisecond pulsar), black holes, and the epoch of reionization.

== Biography ==
Backer was born in Plainfield, New Jersey. He attended Cornell University, where he earned a Bachelor's degree in engineering physics (B.E.P.) from Cornell University in 1966. He received a Master of Science degree in radio astronomy from Manchester University in 1968, and then returned to Cornell to earn his doctorate in astronomy in 1971. Backer then took post-doctoral positions first at NRAO in Charlottesville, Virginia (1971–1973), and then at NASA/GSFC in Greenbelt, Maryland (1973–1975). In 1975, Backer moved to the University of California, Berkeley as a research astronomer in the Radio Astronomy Laboratory, and became professor of astronomy at Berkeley in 1989. Backer served as the acting chair of the Berkeley Astronomy Department from 1998 to 1999, as vice chair 1999–2001, and as chair 2002–2006 and 2007–2008. In 2008, he was appointed director of Berkeley's Radio Astronomy Laboratory. Backer collapsed outside his home and died on July 25, 2010.

Donald C. Backer was married to the artist Lutz Bacher for almost 40 years.

== Research ==
Backer's early work focused on pulsars. He discovered the first millisecond pulsar, PSR B1937+21, which rotates at 642 Hz (1.558 ms), a rate far beyond what was expected of pulsars before its discovery. Backer was also involved in the discovery of a Jupiter-sized planet around PSR B1620-26, thought to be the oldest known extrasolar planet. Backer pioneered efforts to detect gravitational waves from rapidly rotating neutron stars, aiming to set limits on the gravitational wave background of the universe.

Backer was also a pioneer in Very Long Baseline Interferometry, a technique in radio astronomy used to achieve high angular resolution images of astronomical sources. His efforts here were directed towards understanding Sagittarius A*, the supermassive black hole at the center of the Milky Way.

Backer then moved on to studying reionization, leading a collaboration between the University of California, Berkeley, the University of Virginia, the University of Pennsylvania, and NRAO called the Precision Array for Probing the Epoch of Reionization (PAPER). The project consists of two arrays of antenna, one in West Virginia and the other in South Africa. These arrays are simple long wavelength telescopes that hope to detect the redshifted hydrogen line from a time very early in the history of the universe when hydrogen was neutral, and by doing so study the first objects that formed in the universe.

== Honors ==
- Karl G. Jansky Lectureship of the National Radio Astronomy Observatory in 2003
