= Millisecond pulsar =

Pulsar with a rotational period less than about 10 milliseconds

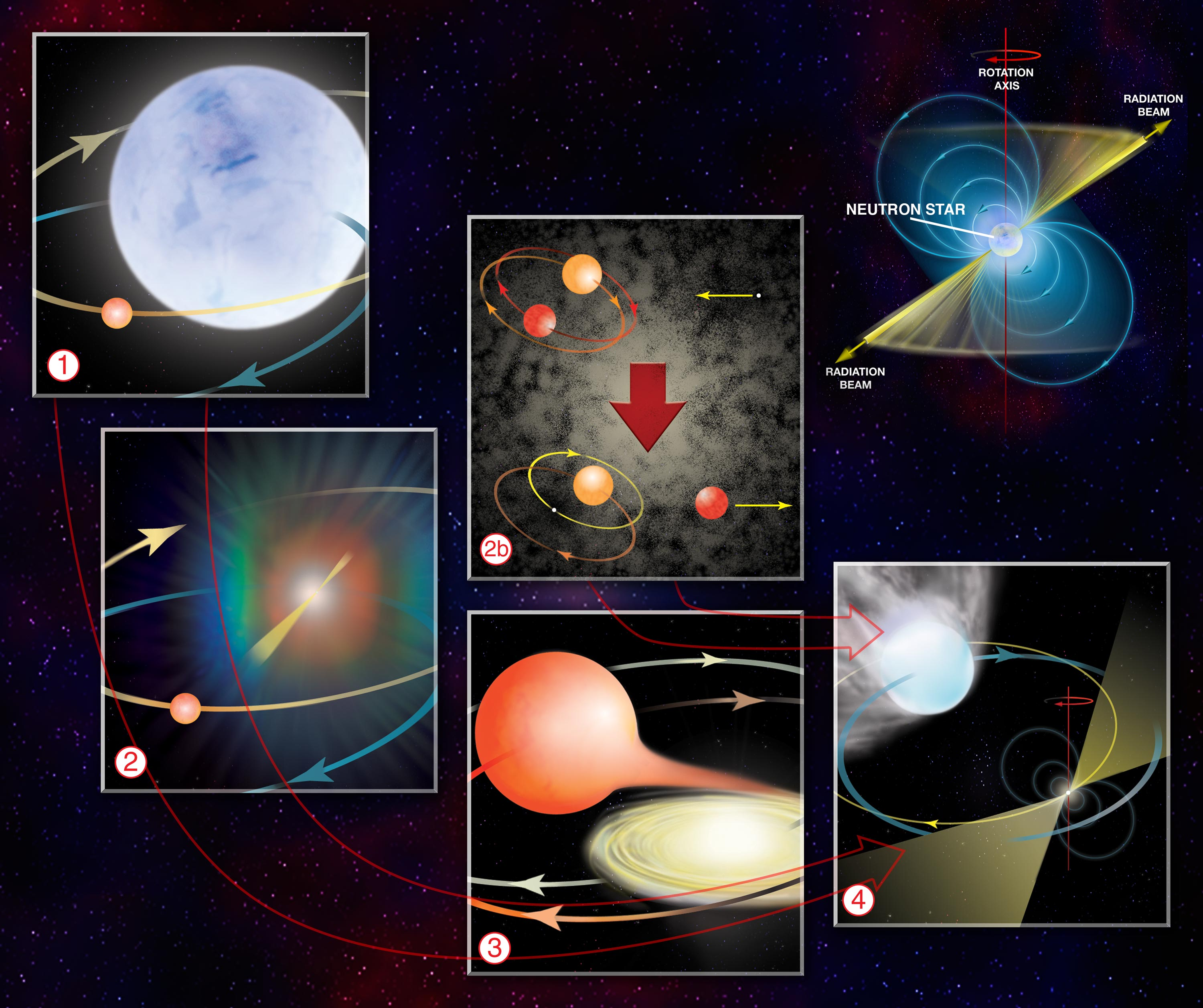
This diagram shows the steps astronomers say are needed to create a pulsar with a superfast spin. 1. A massive supergiant star and a "normal" Sun-like star orbit each other. 2. The massive star explodes, leaving a pulsar that eventually slows down, turns off, and becomes a cooling neutron star. 3. The Sun-like star eventually expands, spilling material on to the neutron star. This "accretion" speeds up the neutron star's spin. 4. Accretion ends, the neutron star is "recycled" into a millisecond pulsar. But in a densely packed globular cluster (2b)... The lowest mass stars are ejected, the remaining normal stars evolve, and the "recycling" scenario (3–4) takes place, creating many millisecond pulsars.

A millisecond pulsar (MSP) is a pulsar with a rotational period less than about 10 milliseconds. Millisecond pulsars have been detected in radio, X-ray, and gamma ray portions of the electromagnetic spectrum. The leading hypothesis for the origin of millisecond pulsars is that they are old, rapidly rotating neutron stars that have been spun up or "recycled" through accretion of matter from a companion star in a close binary system. For this reason, millisecond pulsars are sometimes called recycled pulsars.

== Origins ==
Millisecond pulsars are thought to be related to low-mass X-ray binary systems. It is thought that the X-rays in these systems are emitted by the accretion disk of a neutron star produced by the outer layers of a companion star that has overflowed its Roche lobe. The transfer of angular momentum from this accretion event can increase the rotation rate of the pulsar to hundreds of times per second, as is observed in millisecond pulsars.

There has been recent evidence that the standard evolutionary model fails to explain the evolution of all millisecond pulsars, especially young millisecond pulsars with relatively high magnetic fields, e.g. PSR B1937+21. Bülent Kiziltan and S. E. Thorsett (UCSC) showed that different millisecond pulsars must form by at least two distinct processes. But the nature of the other process remains a mystery.

Many millisecond pulsars are found in globular clusters. This is consistent with the spin-up hypothesis of their formation, as the extremely high stellar density of these clusters implies a much higher likelihood of a pulsar having (or capturing) a giant companion star. Currently there are approximately 130 millisecond pulsars known in globular clusters. The globular cluster Terzan 5 contains 37 of these, followed by 47 Tucanae with 22 and M28 and M15 with 8 pulsars each.

== Pulsar rotational speed limits ==
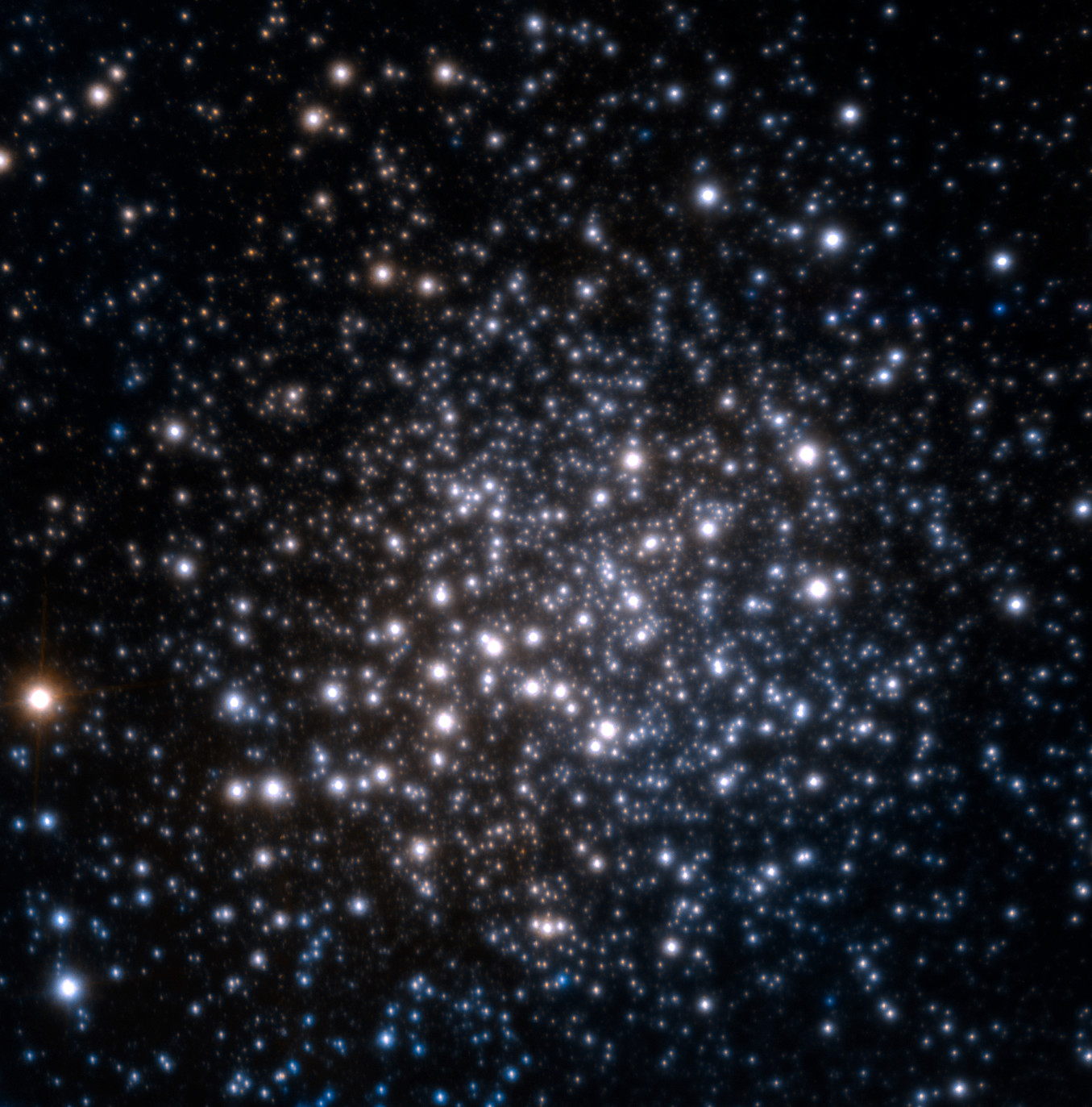
The stellar grouping Terzan 5

The first millisecond pulsar, PSR B1937+21, was discovered in 1982 by Backer et al. Spinning roughly 641 times per second, it remains the second fastest-spinning millisecond pulsar of the approximately 200 that had been discovered by 2009. Pulsar PSR J1748-2446ad, discovered in 2004, is the fastest-spinning pulsar known, as of 2025, spinning 716 times per second.

Current models of neutron star structure and evolution predict that pulsars would break apart if they spun at a rate of c. 1500 rotations per second or more, and that at a rate of above about 1000 rotations per second (sub-millisecond) they would lose energy by gravitational radiation and magnetic spin-down faster than the accretion process would accelerate them.

In early 2007 data from the Rossi X-ray Timing Explorer and INTEGRAL spacecraft discovered a neutron star XTE J1739-285 rotating at 1122 Hz. The result is not statistically significant, with a significance level of only 3 sigma. While it is an interesting candidate for further observations, current results are inconclusive. Still, it is believed that gravitational radiation plays a role in slowing the rate of rotation. One X-ray pulsar that spins at 599 revolutions per second, IGR J00291+5934, is a prime candidate for helping detect such waves in the future (most such X-ray pulsars only spin at around 300 rotations per second).

Millisecond pulsars, which can be timed with high precision, have a stability comparable to atomic-clock-based time standards when averaged over decades. This also makes them very sensitive probes of their environments. For example, anything placed in orbit around them causes periodic Doppler shifts in their pulses' arrival times on Earth, which can then be analyzed to reveal the presence of the companion and, with enough data, provide precise measurements of the orbit and the object's mass. The technique is so sensitive that even objects as small as asteroids can be detected if they happen to orbit a millisecond pulsar. The first confirmed exoplanets, discovered several years before the first detections of exoplanets around "normal" solar-like stars, were found in orbit around a millisecond pulsar, PSR B1257+12. These planets remained, for many years, the only Earth-mass objects known outside of the Solar System. One of them, PSR B1257+12 b, has an even smaller mass, just under twice that of the Moon, and is still today the smallest-mass object known beyond the Solar System.

== Gravitational wave detection using pulsar timing ==
Gravitational waves are an important prediction from Einstein's general theory of relativity and result from the bulk motion of matter, fluctuations during the early universe and the dynamics of space-time itself. Pulsars are rapidly rotating, highly magnetized neutron stars formed during the supernova explosions of massive stars. They act as highly accurate clocks with a wealth of physical applications ranging from celestial mechanics, neutron star seismology, tests of strong-field gravity, and galactic astronomy.

The proposal to use pulsars as gravitational wave detectors was originally made by Sazhin and Detweiler in the late 1970s. The idea is to treat the solar system barycenter and a distant pulsar as opposite ends of an imaginary arm in space. The pulsar acts as the reference clock at one end of the arm sending out regular signals which are monitored by an observer on the Earth. The effect of a passing gravitational wave would be to perturb the local space-time metric and cause a change in the observed rotational frequency of the pulsar.

Plot of correlation between pulsars observed by NANOGrav (2023) vs angular separation between pulsars, compared with a theoretical model (dashed violet) and if there were no gravitational wave background (solid green)

Hellings and Downs extended this idea in 1983 to an array of pulsars and found that a stochastic background of gravitational waves would produce a quadrupolar correlation between different pulsar pairs as a function of their angular separations on the sky. This work was limited in sensitivity by the precision and stability of the pulsar clocks in the array. Following the discovery of the first millisecond pulsar in 1982, Foster and Backer improved the sensitivity to gravitational waves by applying in 1990 the Hellings-Downs analysis to an array of highly stable millisecond pulsars.

The advent of digital data acquisition systems, new radio telescopes and receiver systems, and the discoveries of many new millisecond pulsars advanced the sensitivity of the pulsar timing array to gravitational waves in the early stages of the international effort. The five-year data release, analysis, and first NANOGrav limit on the stochastic gravitational wave background were described in 2013 by Demorest et al. It was followed by the nine-year and 11-year data releases in 2015 and 2018, respectively. Each further limited the gravitational wave background and, in the second case, techniques to precisely determine the barycenter of the solar system were refined.

In 2020, the collaboration presented the 12.5-year data release, which included strong evidence for a power-law stochastic process with common strain amplitude and spectral index across all pulsars, but statistically inconclusive data for the critical Hellings-Downs quadrupolar spatial correlation.

In June 2023, NANOGrav published its 15-year data release, at the same time as the European Pulsar Timing Array and the Indian Pulsar Timing Array's combined data set, the Parkes Pulsar Timing Array's third data release, and the first data release from the Chinese Pulsar Timing Array. These data releases presented the first evidence for a stochastic gravitational wave background. In particular, it included the first measurements of the Hellings-Downs curve, the tell-tale sign of the gravitational wave origin of the observations. The MeerKAT Pulsar Timing Array published further evidence for the Hellings-Downs curve in December 2024.
