= European Pulsar Timing Array =

Five-radio telescope collaboration to track stellar remnants' gravitational waves

The EPTA logo.

The European Pulsar Timing Array (EPTA) is a European collaboration to combine five 100-m class radio-telescopes to observe an array of pulsars with the specific goal of detecting gravitational waves. It is one of several pulsar timing array projects in operation, and one of the four projects comprising the International Pulsar Timing Array, the others being the Parkes Pulsar Timing Array, the North American Nanohertz Observatory for Gravitational Waves, and the Indian Pulsar Timing Array.

== Pulsars and high-precision timing ==
Pulsars are rapidly rotating, highly magnetised neutron stars that emit radio waves from their magnetic poles that are, due to the star's rotation, observed on Earth as a string of pulses. Due to the extremely high density of neutron stars, their rotation periods are very stable, hence the observed arrival time of the pulses are highly regular. These arrival times are called TOAs (time of arrival) and can be used to perform high-precision timing experiments.

The stability of the TOAs from most pulsars is limited due to the presence of red noise, also called "timing noise". However, there is a special class of pulsars, called millisecond pulsars (MSP), that are shown to suffer from little or no timing noise. Keeping track of the TOAs of different MSPs over the sky allows for a high-precision timing experiment to detect gravitational waves.

== Detection of gravitational waves ==
Gravitational waves (GW) are small disturbances in space-time, caused by the motion of masses, if the third time derivative of the mass quadrupole moment is non-zero. These waves are very weak, such that only the strongest waves, caused by the rapid motion of dense stars or black-holes, have a chance of being detected. A pulsar timing array (PTA) uses an array of MSPs as the endpoints of a Galaxy-scale GW detector. It is sensitive to GWs with a frequency in the nanohertz regime, which corresponds to the regime where the stochastic GW background, caused by the coalescence of super-massive black holes in the early Universe, is predicted to exist. This makes PTAs complementary to other GW detectors such as LIGO, VIRGO and LISA.

The EPTA is one component of a worldwide collaboration for detecting and measuring gravitational waves, the International Pulsar Timing Array, which also includes the North American Nanohertz Observatory for Gravitational Waves (NANOGrav) and the Parkes Pulsar Timing Array (PPTA).

== Telescopes ==
The EPTA uses five European telescopes. These are the Westerbork Synthesis Radio Telescope, the Effelsberg Radio Telescope, the Lovell Telescope, the Nançay Radio Telescope and the Sardinia Radio Telescope.

== LEAP ==
The LEAP logo.

Since 2009, the EPTA has made some progress thanks to a project European Research Council funded project known as the Large European Array for Pulsars (LEAP). The aim of this project is to coherently combine the five EPTA telescopes to synthesise the equivalent of a fully steerable 194-m dish. This will improve the accuracy with which the pulsar TOAs can be measured by an order of magnitude, essential for the first detection of gravitational waves within the next decade.
