= North American Nanohertz Observatory for Gravitational Waves =

Astronomy organization

NANOGrav
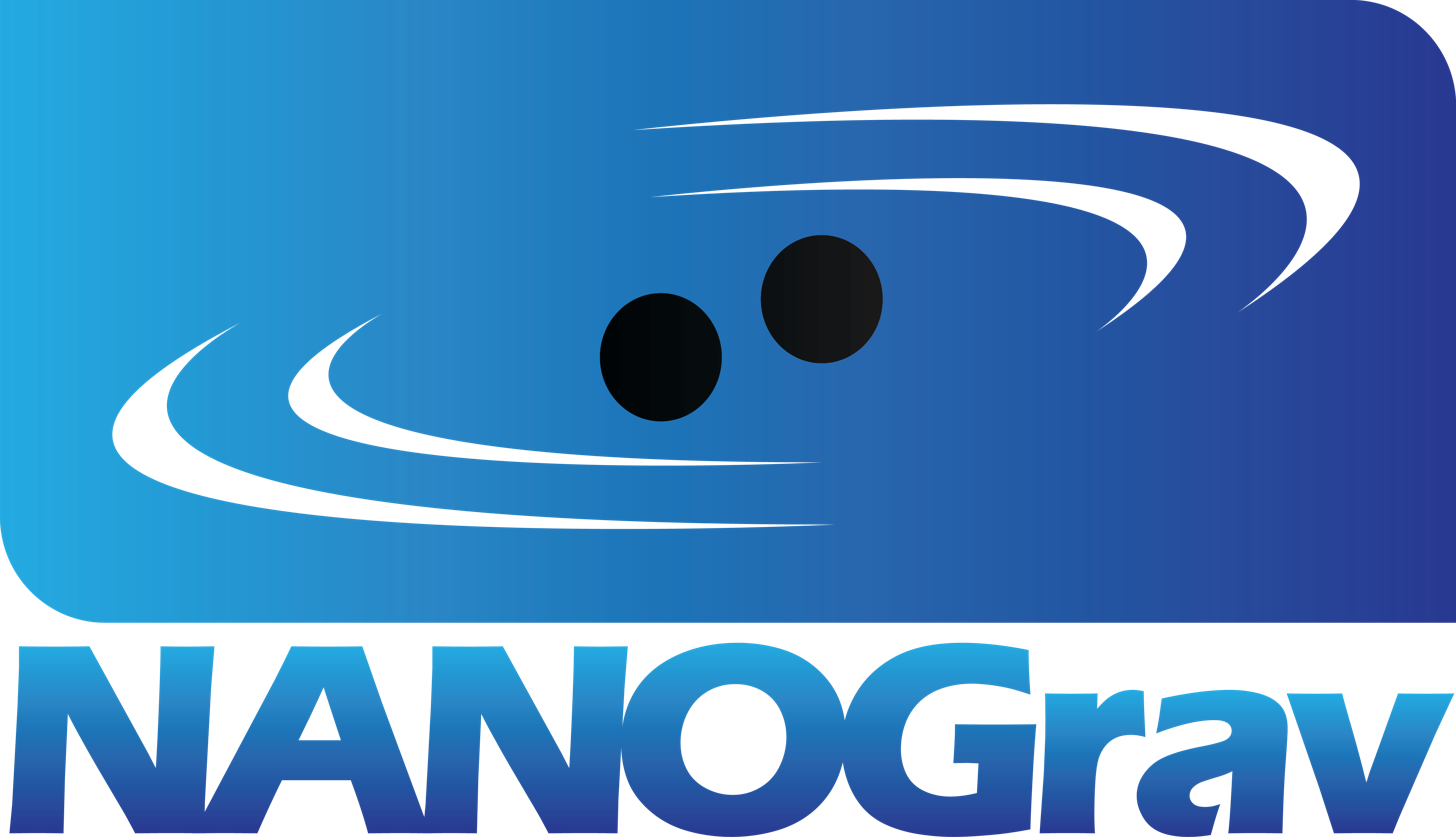
- Alternative names: NANOGrav
- Website: https://nanograv.org

The North American Nanohertz Observatory for Gravitational Waves (NANOGrav) Physics Frontier Center is a consortium of astronomers who share a common goal of detecting gravitational waves via regular observations of an ensemble of millisecond pulsars to create a pulsar timing array. They use data from the Green Bank Telescope, Arecibo Observatory, the Very Large Array, and the Canadian Hydrogen Intensity Mapping Experiment (CHIME). Future observing plans include up to 25% total time of the Deep Synoptic Array. This project is being carried out in collaboration with international partners in the Parkes Pulsar Timing Array in Australia, the European Pulsar Timing Array, and the Indian Pulsar Timing Array as part of the International Pulsar Timing Array.

== Gravitational wave detection using pulsar timing ==
Plot of correlation between pulsars observed by NANOGrav vs angular separation between pulsars, compared with a theoretical model (dashed purple, or Hellings–Downs curve) and if there were no gravitational wave background (solid green)

Gravitational waves are an important prediction from Einstein's general theory of relativity and result from the bulk motion of matter, fluctuations during the early universe, and the dynamics of space-time itself. Pulsars are rapidly rotating, highly magnetized neutron stars formed during the supernova explosions of massive stars. They act as highly accurate clocks with a wealth of physical applications ranging from celestial mechanics, neutron star seismology, tests of strong-field gravity, and galactic astronomy.

The idea to use pulsars as gravitational wave detectors was originally proposed by Sazhin and Detweiler in the late 1970s. The idea is to treat the Solar System barycenter and a distant pulsar as opposite ends of an imaginary arm in space. The pulsar acts as the reference clock at one end of the arm sending out regular signals which are monitored by an observer on the Earth. The effect of a passing gravitational wave would be to perturb the local space-time metric and cause a change in the observed rotational frequency of the pulsar.

Hellings and Downs extended this idea in 1983 to an array of pulsars and found that a stochastic background of gravitational waves would produce a correlated signal for different angular separations on the sky, now known as the Hellings–Downs curve. This work was limited in sensitivity by the precision and stability of the pulsar clocks in the array. Following the discovery of the first millisecond pulsar in 1982, Foster and Donald C. Backer were among the first astronomers to seriously improve the sensitivity to gravitational waves by applying the Hellings-Downs analysis to an array of highly stable millisecond pulsars.

The advent of state-of-the-art digital data acquisition systems, new radio telescopes and receiver systems, and the discoveries of many new pulsars advanced the sensitivity of the pulsar timing array to gravitational waves. The 2010 paper by Hobbs et al. summarizes the early state of the international effort. The 2013 Demorest et al. paper describes the five-year data release, analysis, and first NANOGrav limit on the stochastic gravitational wave background. It was followed by the nine-year and 11-year data releases in 2015 and 2018, respectively. Each further limited the gravitational wave background and, in the second case, techniques to precisely determine the barycenter of the solar system were refined.

In 2020, the collaboration presented the first evidence of gravitational wave background within the 12.5-year data release, taking the shape of a noise consistent with the expectations; however, it could not be definitely attributed to gravitational waves.

In the 2020 Decadal Survey of Astronomy and Astrophysics, the National Academies of Science named NANOGrav as one of eight mid-scale astrophysics projects recommended as high priorities for funding in the next decade.

In June 2023, NANOGrav published further evidence for a stochastic gravitational wave background using the 15-year data release. In particular, it provides a measurement of the Hellings–Downs curve, the unique sign of the gravitational wave origin of the observations.

== Funding sources ==
The NSF first funded researchers within NANOGrav as part of the Partnerships for International Research and Education (PIRE) program from 2010 to 2015; the Physics Frontiers Center (PFC) program from 2015 to 2021; and from a second PFC grant starting in 2021. NANOGrav as a NSF PFC has been supported by the NSF Divisions of Physics and Astronomical Sciences and the Windows on the Universe program. The NSF has also contributed to supporting International Pulsar Timing Array through the AccelNet program. NANOGrav has additionally been supported by The Gordon and Betty Moore Foundation, the Natural Sciences and Engineering Research Council of Canada, and the Canadian Institute for Advanced Research.

The research activities of NANOGrav have also been supported by single-investigator grants awarded through the Natural Sciences and Engineering Research Council (NSERC) in Canada, the National Science Foundation (NSF) and the Research Corporation for Scientific Advancement in the USA.
