= Timeline of gravitational physics and relativity =

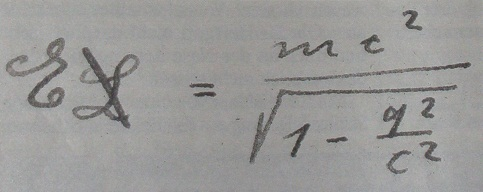
Einstein's mass-energy equation in a 1912 manuscript. He originally used $L$ instead of $E$ to denote energy.

The following is a timeline of gravitational physics and general relativity.

== Before 1500 ==
- 3rd century B.C. – Aristarchus of Samos proposes the heliocentric model.

== 1500s ==
- 1543 – Nicolaus Copernicus publishes On the Revolutions of Heavenly Spheres.
- 1583 – Galileo Galilei deduces the period relationship of a pendulum from observations (according to later biographer).
- 1586 – Simon Stevin demonstrates that two objects of different masses accelerate at the same rate when dropped.
- 1589 – Galileo Galilei describes a hydrostatic balance for measuring specific gravity.
- 1590 – Galileo Galilei formulates modified Aristotelian theory of motion (later retracted) based on density rather than weight of objects.

== 1600s ==
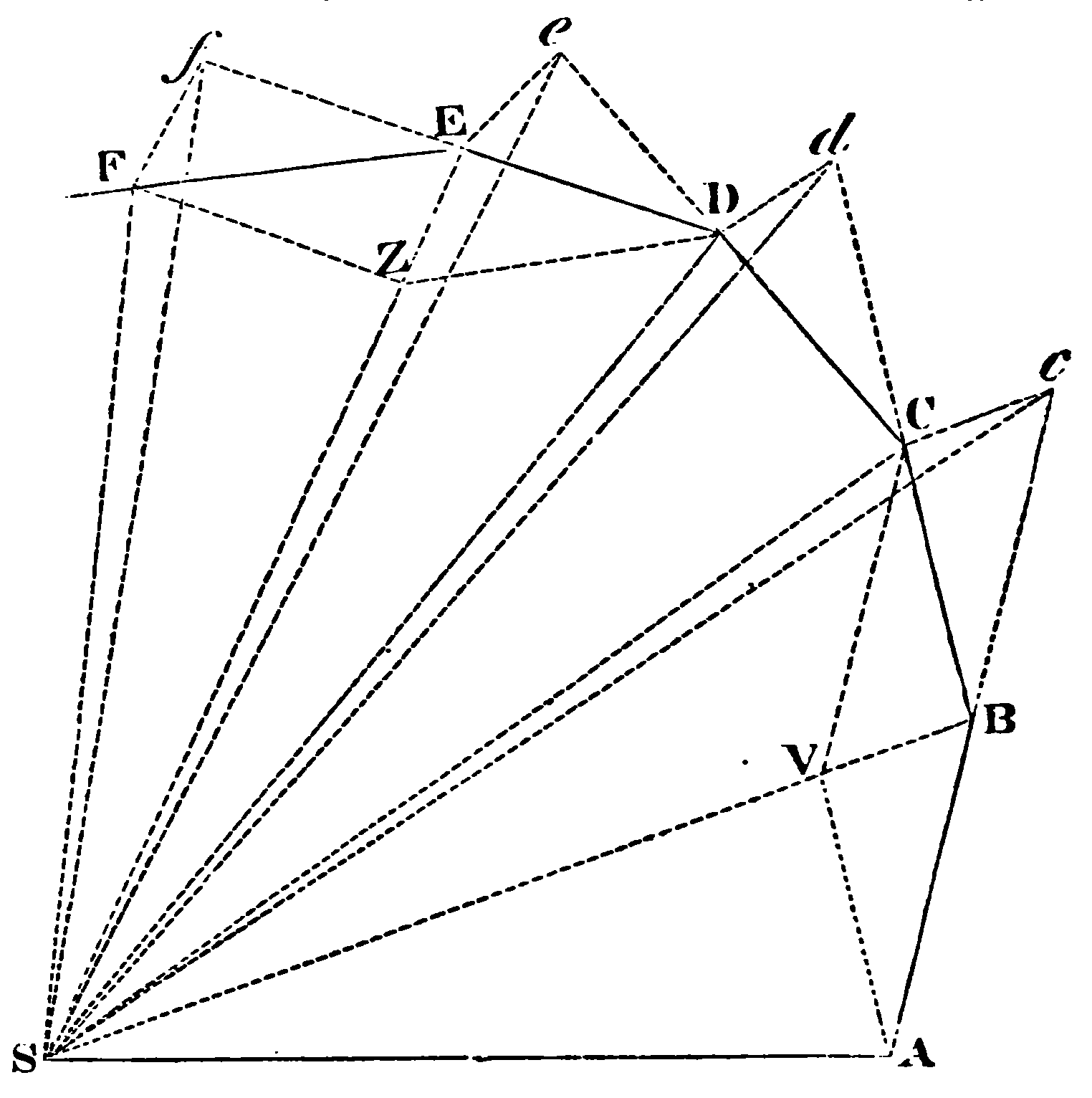
Geometric diagram for Newton's proof of Kepler's second law.

- 1602-1608 – Galileo Galilei experiments with pendulum motion and inclined planes; deduces his law of free fall; and discovers that projectiles travel along parabolic trajectories.
- 1609 – Johannes Kepler announces his first two laws of planetary motion.
- 1610 – Johannes Kepler states the dark night paradox.
- 1610 – Galileo Galilei publishes The Sidereal Messenger, detailing his astronomical discoveries made with a telescope.
- 1619 – Johannes Kepler unveils his third law of planetary motion.
- 1665-66 – Isaac Newton introduces an inverse-square law of universal gravitation uniting terrestrial and celestial theories of motion and uses it to predict the orbit of the Moon and the parabolic arc of projectiles (the latter using his generalization of the binomial theorem).
- 1673 – Christiaan Huygens publishes his The Pendulum Clock, describing the motion of pendulums and the formula for centripetal acceleration during uniform circular motion, known to Isaac Newton since the 1660s.
- 1676-9 – Ole Rømer makes the first scientific determination of the speed of light.
- 1684 – Isaac Newton proves that planets moving under an inverse-square force law will obey Kepler's laws in a letter to Edmond Halley.
- 1686 – Isaac Newton uses a fixed length pendulum with weights of varying composition to test the weak equivalence principle to 1 part in 1000.
- 1686 – Isaac Newton publishes his Mathematical Principles of Natural Philosophy, where he develops his calculus, states his laws of motion and gravitation, proves the shell theorem, describes his rotating bucket thought experiment, explains the tides, and calculates the figure of the Earth.
- 1692 – Richard Bentley states his cosmological paradox in a letter to Newton.

== 1700s ==
- 1705 – Edmond Halley predicts the return of Halley's comet in 1758, the first use of Newton's laws by someone other than Newton himself.
- 1728 – Isaac Newton posthumously publishes his cannonball thought experiment.
- 1730s – Alexis Clairault examines equipotential surfaces and develops the notions of partial differentiation and exact differentials.
- 1742 – Colin Maclaurin studies a self-gravitating uniform liquid drop at equilibrium, the Maclaurin spheroid.
- 1740s – Jean le Rond d'Alembert and Leonhard Euler independently examine the precession of the equinoxes and nutation of the Earth. In the process, they develop the dynamics of rigid bodies.
- 1740s-1750s – Leonhard Euler and Alexis Clairault independently derive the equations of motion for the three-body problem and apply them to the Moon.
- 1755 – Immanuel Kant advances Emanuel Swedenborg's nebular hypothesis on the origin of the Solar System.

Lagrange points

- 1765 – Leonhard Euler discovers the first three Lagrange points.
- 1767 – Leonhard Euler solves Euler's restricted three-body problem.
- 1772 – Joseph-Louis Lagrange discovers the two remaining Lagrange points.
- 1770s – Pierre-Simon de Laplace develops equations for the tides that take into account both gravitation and rotation.
- 1770s-1780s – Joseph-Louis Lagrange and Pierre-Simon de Laplace investigate the stability of the Solar System.
- 1780s – Adrien-Marie Legendre and Pierre-Simon de Laplace study the gravitational attraction of spheroids in spherical coordinates and introduce the Legendre polynomials.
- 1781 – William Herschel discovers the planet Uranus.
- 1783 – John Michell speculates that a star could be so massive that its gravitational field would prevent light from escaping. Pierre-Simon de Laplace proposes the same thing in 1795.
- 1796 – Pierre-Simon de Laplace independently introduces the nebular hypothesis.
- 1798 – Henry Cavendish tests Newton's law of universal gravitation using a torsion balance, leading to the first accurate value for the gravitational constant and the mean density of the Earth.
- 1799-1825 – Pierre-Simon de Laplace publishes his Treatise on Celestial Mechanics, in five volumes.

== 1800s ==
- 1846 – Urbain Le Verrier and John Couch Adams independently show that the orbit of Uranus is perturbed by another planet, Neptune, promptly discovered by Johann Gottfried Galle.
- 1849 – Armand Fizeau makes the first terrestrial determination of the speed of light.
- 1855 – Le Verrier observes a 38 arc-second per century excess precession of Mercury's orbit and attributes it to another planet, inside Mercury's orbit. The planet, called Vulcan, was never found. Le Verrier's figure is revised by Simon Newcomb to 43 arc-second per century in 1882.
- 1876 – William Kingdon Clifford suggests that the motion of matter may be due to changes in the geometry of space.
- 1880 – Aurel Voss discovers the contracted Bianchi identities, subsequently rediscovered independently by Gregorio Ricci-Curbastro in 1889 and Luigi Bianchi in 1902.
- 1884 – William Thomson (Lord Kelvin) lectures on the issues with the wave theory of light with regards to the luminiferous ether.
- 1887 – Albert A. Michelson and Edward W. Morley report a null result in their experiment to detect the ether drift.
- 1888 – Oliver Heaviside calculates the electromagnetic field of a moving point charge at constant velocity, and realizes, with some help by George Frederick Charles Searle, that the field contracts in the direction of motion.
- 1889 – Loránd Eötvös uses a torsion balance to test the weak equivalence principle to 1 part in one billion.
- 1892 – George Francis FitzGerald explains his hypothesis that the Michelson-Morley interferometer contracts in the direction of motion through the luminiferous ether to Oliver Lodge.
- 1893 – Ernst Mach states Mach's principle, the first constructive critique of the idea of Newtonian absolute space.
- 1897 – Henri Poincaré questions whether absolute space, absolute time, and Euclidean geometry are applicable to physics.

== 1900s ==
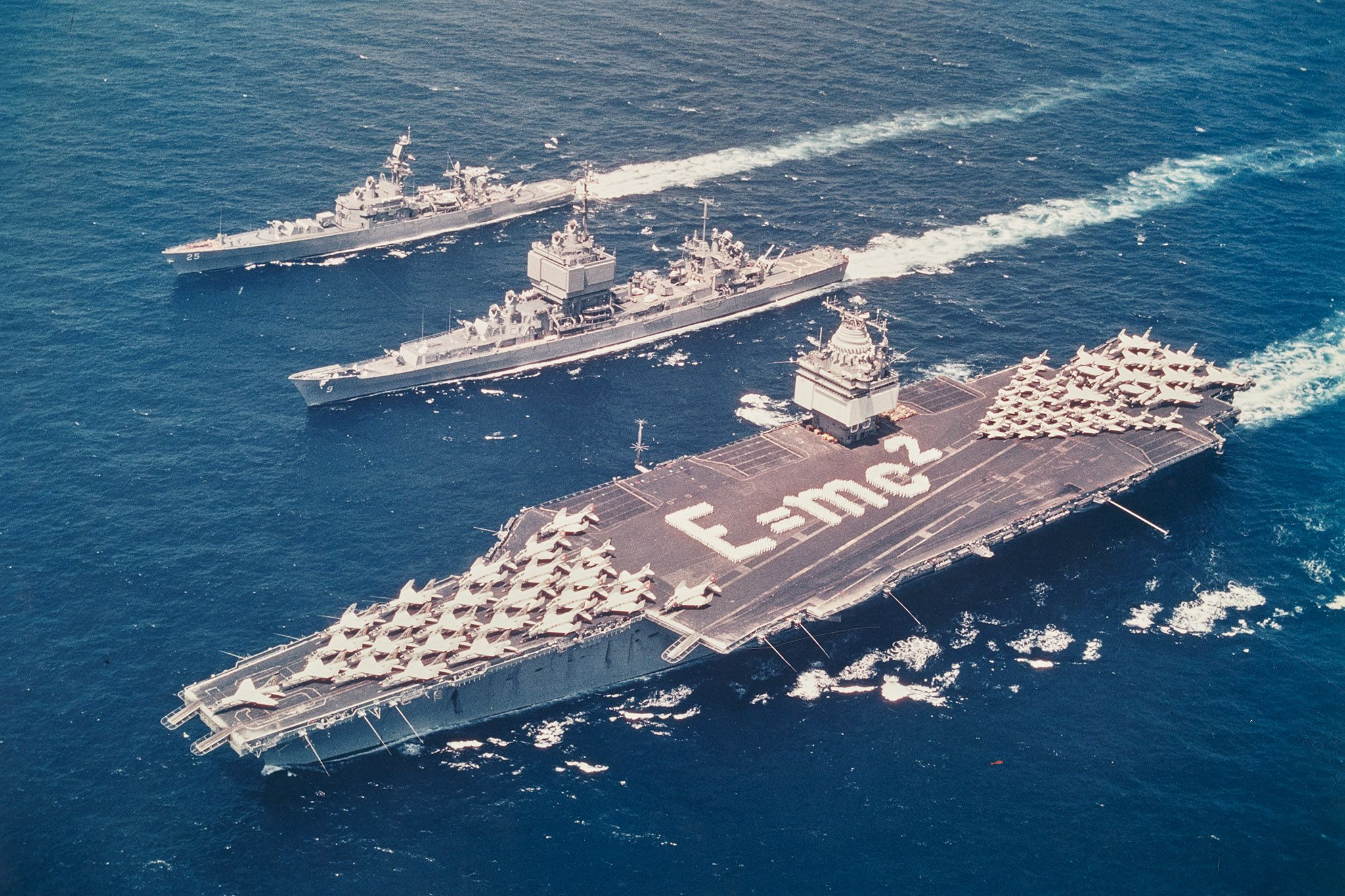
The U.S. Navy's nuclear-powered Task Force 1 underway for Operation Sea Orbit in the Mediterranean, 1964, while displaying Einstein's mass-energy equation.

- 1902 – Paul Gerber explains the movement of the perihelion of Mercury using finite speed of gravity. His formula, at least approximately, matches the later model from Einstein's general relativity, but Gerber's theory was incorrect.
- 1902 – Henri Poincaré questions the concept of simultaneity in his book, Science and Hypothesis.
- 1904 – Hendrik Antoon Lorentz publishes the Lorentz transformations, so named by Henri Poincaré.
- 1902 – Henri Poincaré shows that the Lorentz transformations form a mathematical group, called the Lorentz group, and derives the relativistic formula for adding velocities.
- 1905 – Albert Einstein completes his special theory of relativity and examines relativistic aberration and the transverse Doppler effect.
- 1905 – Albert Einstein discovers the equivalence of mass and energy, $E = mc^2$ in modern form. He notes that it may be tested using radioactive substances. He returns to the problem multiple times later.
- 1906 – Max Planck coins the term Relativtheorie. Albert Einstein later uses the term Relativitätstheorie in a conversation with Paul Ehrenfest. He originally prefers calling it Invariance Theory.
- 1906 – Max Planck discovers the energy-momentum relation and formulates a variational principle for special relativity.
- 1907 – Albert Einstein introduces the principle of equivalence of gravitational and inertial mass and uses it to predict gravitational lensing and gravitational redshift, historically known as the Einstein shift.
- 1907-8 – Hermann Minkowski introduces the Minkowski spacetime and expresses electromagnetic field strengths as a second-rank tensor. He also coins the terms spacelike, timelike, light cone, and world line. His paper is published posthumously.
- 1909 – Max Born proposes his notion of rigidity.
- 1909 – Paul Ehrenfest states the Ehrenfest paradox.

=== 1910s ===
Einstein's 1911 argument for gravitational redshift

- 1911 – Max von Laue publishes the first textbook on special relativity.
- 1911 – Albert Einstein explains the need to replace both special relativity and Newton's theory of gravity; he realizes that the principle of equivalence only holds locally, not globally.
- 1912 – Friedrich Kottler applies the notion of tensors to curved spacetime.
- 1915-16 – Albert Einstein completes his general theory of relativity. He explains the perihelion of Mercury and calculates gravitational lensing correctly and introduces the post-Newtonian approximation.
- 1915 – David Hilbert independently introduces the Einstein-Hilbert action. Hilbert also recognizes the connection between the Einstein equations and the Gauss-Bonnet theorem.
- 1916 – Karl Schwarzschild publishes the Schwarzschild metric about a month after Einstein published his general theory of relativity. This was the first solution to the Einstein field equations other than the trivial flat space solution.
- 1916 – Hans Reissner obtains the Reissner–Nordström solution, rediscovered in 1918 by Gunnar Nordström.
- 1916 – Albert Einstein predicts the existence of gravitational waves, traveling at the speed of light.
- 1916 – Willem de Sitter predicts the geodetic effect.
- 1917 – Albert Einstein applies his field equations to the entire Universe. Physical cosmology is born.
- 1916-20 – Arthur Eddington studies the internal constitution of the stars.
- 1918 – Albert Einstein derives the quadrupole formula for gravitational radiation.
- 1918 – Emmy Noether publishes Noether's theorem and resolves the issue of local energy conservation in general relativity.
- 1918 – Felix Klein applies the calculus of variations to deduce the conservation laws of general relativity.
- 1918 – Josef Lense and Hans Thirring find the gravitomagnetic frame-dragging of gyroscopes in the equations of general relativity.
- 1919 – Arthur Eddington leads a solar eclipse expedition which detects gravitational deflection of light by the Sun, which, despite opinion to the contrary, survives modern scrutiny. Other teams fail for reasons of war and politics.

=== 1920s ===
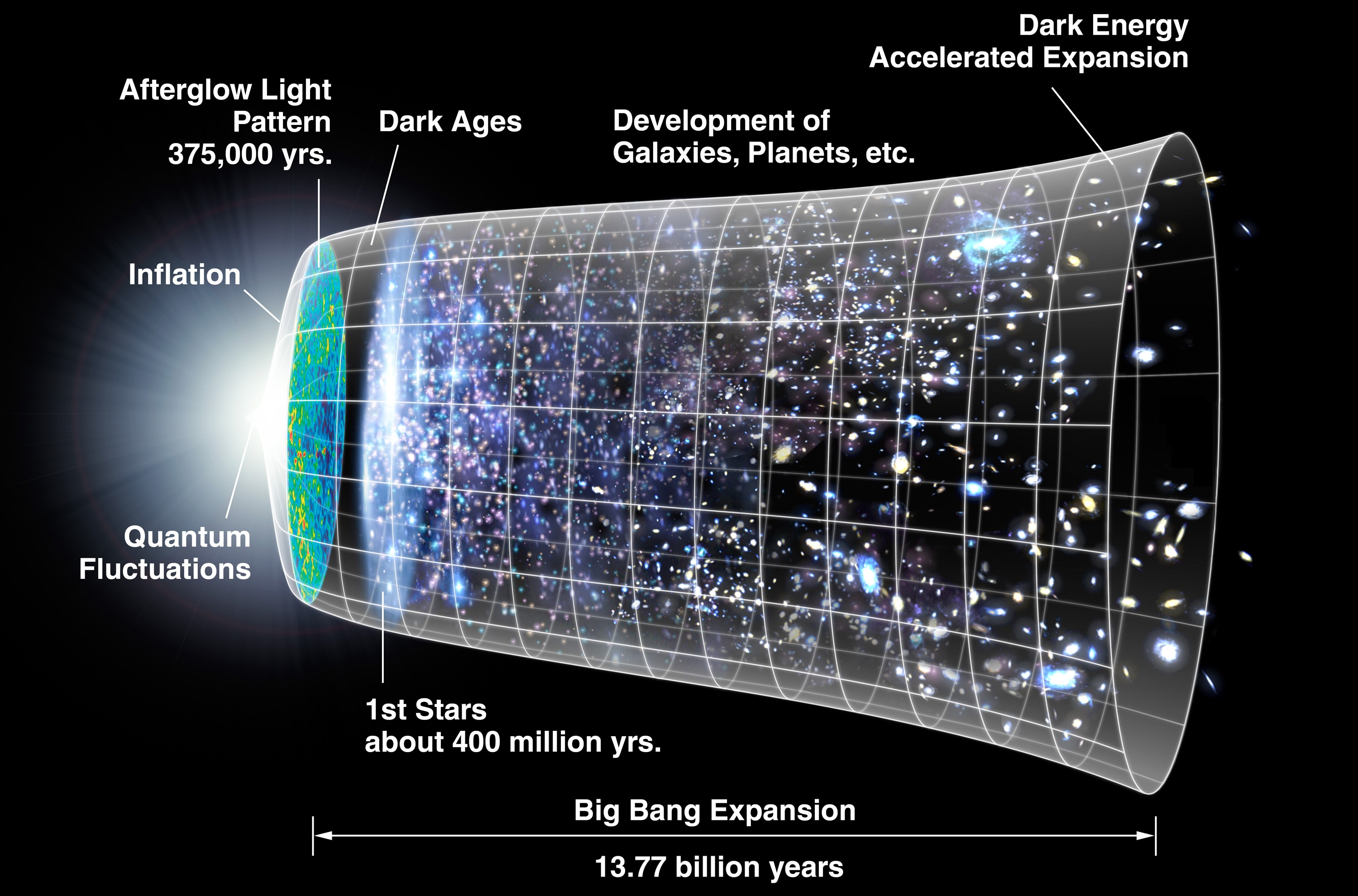
The history and expansion of the universe

- 1921 – Theodor Kaluza demonstrates that a five-dimensional version of Einstein's equations unifies gravitation and electromagnetism. This idea is later extended by Oskar Klein to incorporate quantum mechanics.
- 1922 – Alexander Friedmann derives the Friedmann equations.
- 1922 – Enrico Fermi introduces the Fermi coordinates. This is developed further in 1932 by Arthur Walker into the Fermi-Walker transport.
- 1923 – George David Birkhoff proves Birkhoff's theorem on the uniqueness of the Schwarzschild solution.
- 1924 – Arthur Eddington calculates the Eddington limit.
- 1924 – Cornelius Lanczos discovers the van Stockum dust, later rediscovered by Willem Jacob van Stockum in 1938.
- 1925 – Walter Adams measures the gravitational redshift of the light emitted by the companion of Sirius B, a white dwarf.
- 1927 – Georges Lemaître publishes his hypothesis of the primeval atom.
- 1929 – Edwin Hubble published the law later named for him.

=== 1930s ===
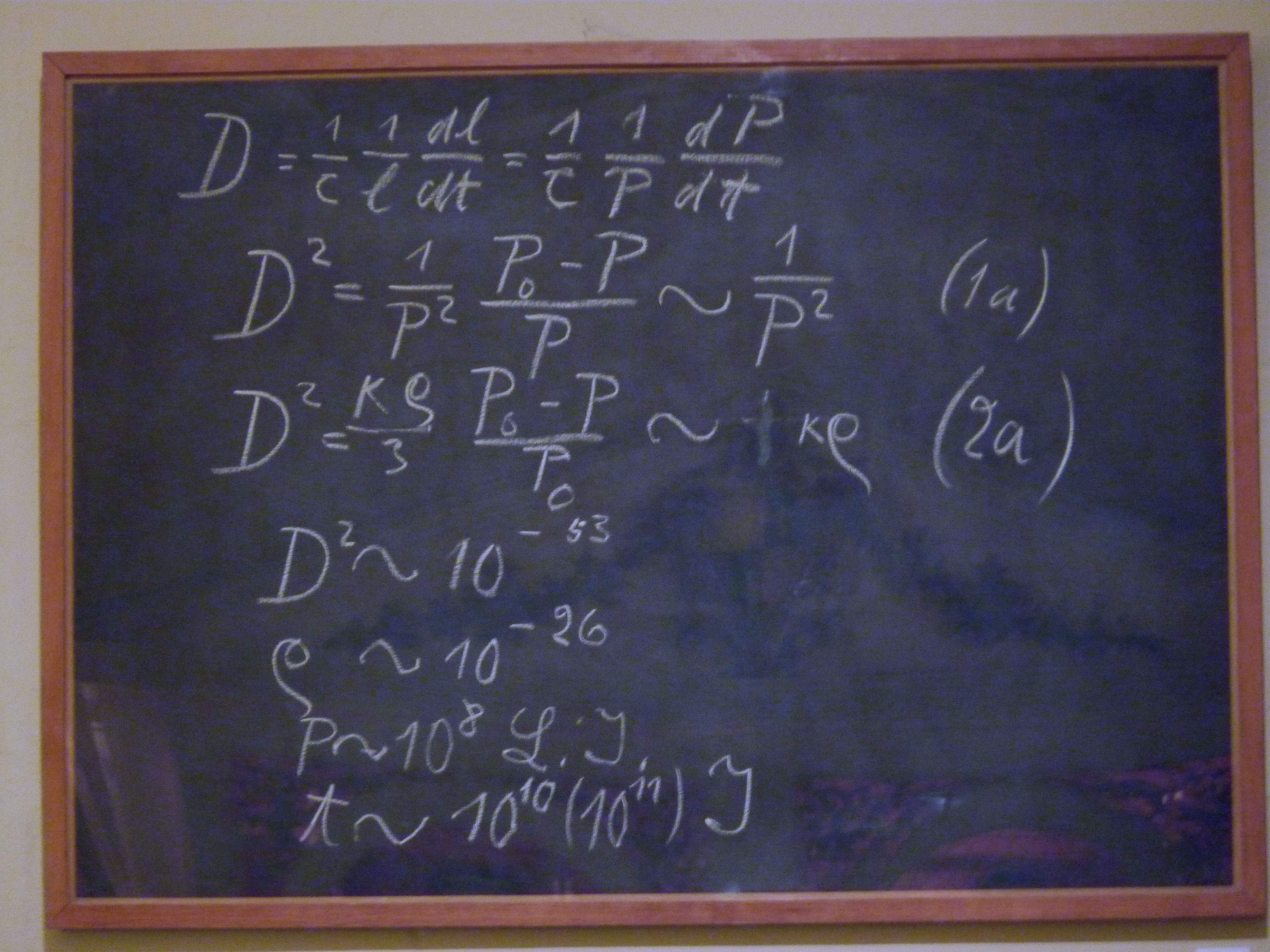
- Einstein lectured on cosmology at the University of Oxford in 1931 using this blackboard, now preserved at the Oxford's Museum of the History of Science. The last expression is Einstein's estimate for the age of the Universe.
  1931 – Subrahmanyan Chandrasekhar studies the stability of white dwarfs.
- 1931 – Georges Lemaître and Arthur Eddington predict the expansion of the Universe.
- 1931 – Albert Einstein introduces his cosmological constant.
- 1932 – Albert Einstein and Willem de Sitter propose the Einstein-de Sitter cosmological model.
- 1932 – John Cockcroft and Ernest Walton verify Einstein's mass-energy equation by an experiment artificially transmuting lithium into helium.
- 1933 – Karl Jansky discovers astronomical radio sources.
- 1934 – Dmitry Blokhintsev and F. M. Gal'perin coin the term 'graviton'. Paul Dirac reintroduces it in 1959.
- 1934 – Walter Baade and Fritz Zwicky predict the existence of neutron stars. Although their details are wrong, their basic idea is now accepted.
- 1935 – Albert Einstein and Nathan Rosen derive the Einstein-Rosen bridge, the first wormhole solution.
- 1935 – Howard Robertson and Arthur Walker obtain the Robertson-Walker metric.
- 1936 – Albert Einstein predicts that a gravitational lens brightens the light coming from a distant object to the observer.
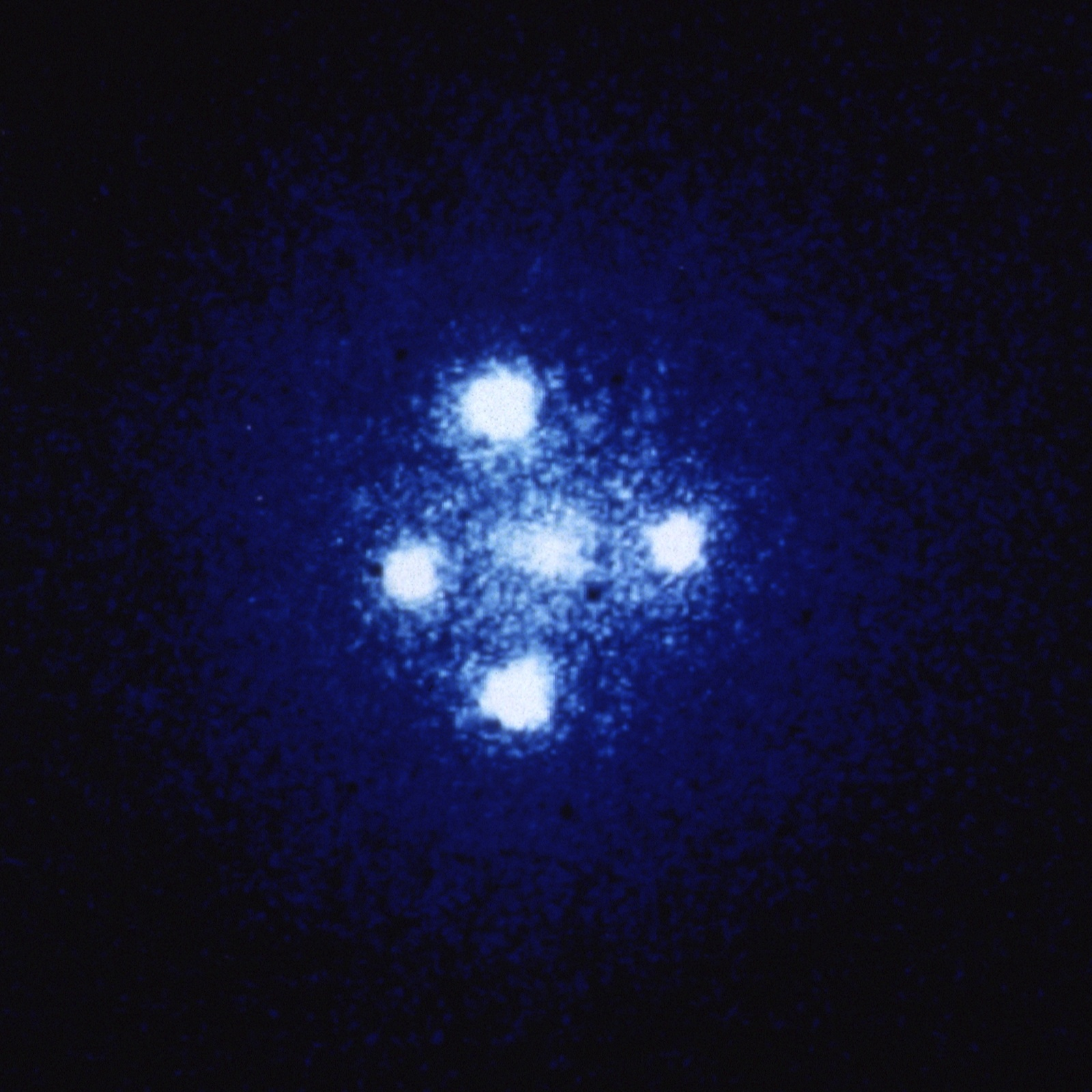
- The Einstein Cross is an example of gravitational lensing at work. This one was discovered in 1985.
  1937 – Fritz Zwicky states that galaxies could act as gravitational lenses.
- 1937 – Albert Einstein and Nathan Rosen obtain the Einstein-Rosen metric, the first exact solution describing gravitational waves.
- 1938 – Albert Einstein, Leopold Infeld, and Banesh Hoffmann obtain the Einstein-Infeld-Hoffmann equations of motion.
- 1939 – Hans Bethe shows that nuclear fusion is responsible for energy production inside stars, building upon the Kelvin–Helmholtz mechanism. Charles Critchfield independently reaches the same conclusion.
- 1939 – Richard Tolman solves the Einstein field equations in the case of a spherical fluid drop.
- 1938-9 – Robert Serber, George Volkoff, Richard Tolman, and J. Robert Oppenheimer determine the Tolman–Oppenheimer–Volkoff limit for the stability of neutron stars.
- 1939 – J. Robert Oppenheimer and Hartland Snyder publish the Oppenheimer-Snyder model for the continued gravitational contraction of a star.

=== 1940s ===
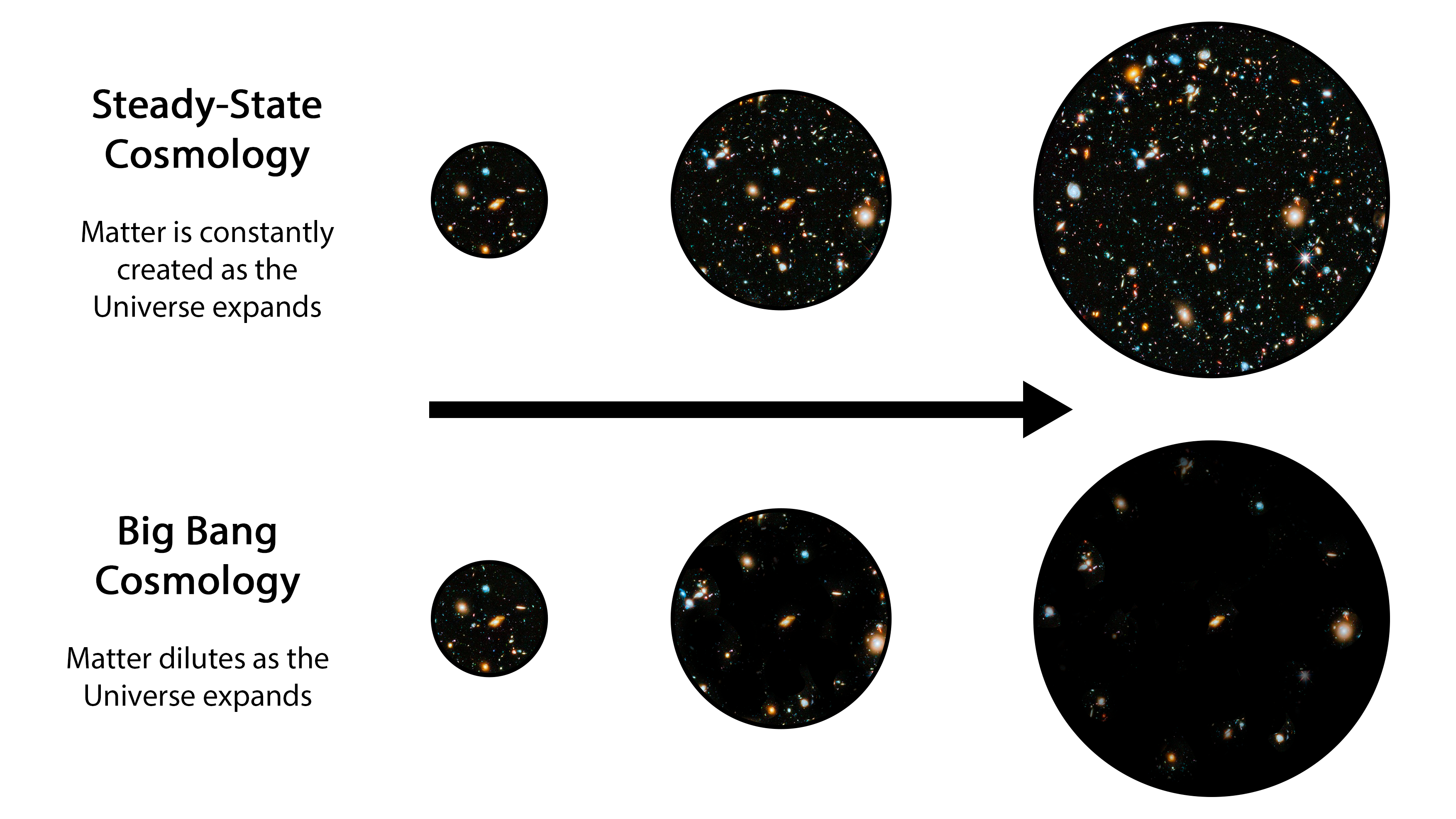
Comparing the Big Bang and Steady State models of the Universe

- 1946 – First radio telescopes and interferometers built in the United Kingdom and Australia.
- 1948 – Ralph Alpher, Hans Bethe, and George Gamow explain the origin of the chemical elements using the notion of an expanding universe.
- 1948 – Ralph Alpher and Robert Herman predict the cosmic microwave background.
- 1949 – Fred Hoyle coins the term "Big Bang" theory in contrast with his "Steady State" model, though the term Big Bang only becomes widespread in the 1970s.
- 1949 – Cornelius Lanczos introduces the Lanczos potential for the Weyl tensor.
- 1949 – Kurt Gödel discovers Gödel's solution and introduces Lie groups to cosmology. Abraham Taub independently applies the same mathematical method in 1951.

=== 1950s ===
- 1950 – John Lighton Synge presents the first maximal analytic extension of the Schwarzschild metric.
- 1952 – Yvonne Choquet-Bruhat proves that the initial-value problem of the Einstein field equations in vacuum is well-posed.
- 1954 – Suraj Gupta sketches how to derive the equations of general relativity from quantum field theory for a massless spin-2 particle (the graviton). His procedure is later carried out by Stanley Deser in 1970.
- 1955 – John Archibald Wheeler proposes the existence of gravitational quantum fluctuations and discusses the importance of the Planck length.
- 1955-56 – Robert Kraichnan shows that under the appropriate assumptions, Einstein's field equations of gravitation arise from the quantum field theory of a massless spin-2 particle coupled to the stress-energy tensor. This follows from his unpublished work as an undergraduate in 1947.
- Some methods of approximation in general relativity
  1956 – Bruno Berlotti develops the post-Minkowskian expansion.
- 1957 – Felix A. E. Pirani uses Petrov classification to understand gravitational radiation.
- 1957 – Richard Feynman introduces his sticky bead argument. He later derives the quadrupole formula in a letter to Victor Weisskopf (1961).
- 1957 – Chapel Hill Conference on the Role of Gravitation in Physics held in Chapel Hill, North Carolina.
- 1957-8 – John Wheeler discusses the breakdown of classical general relativity near singularities and the need for quantum gravity.
- 1958 – David Finkelstein presents a coordinate transformation that removes the Schwarzschild radius as a singularity. It is previously introduced by Arthur Eddington.
- 1959 – Robert Pound and Glen Rebka propose the Pound–Rebka experiment, first precision test of gravitational redshift. The experiment relies on the Mössbauer effect.
- 1959 – Herman Bondi, Felix Pirani, and Ivor Robinson discuss exact gravitational plane waves.
- 1959 – Lluís Bel introduces Bel–Robinson tensor and the Bel decomposition of the Riemann tensor.
- 1959 – Arthur Komar introduces the Komar mass.
- 1959 – Richard Arnowitt, Stanley Deser and Charles W. Misner developed ADM formalism.
- 1959 – Roger Penrose and James Terrell independently predict the Terrell–Penrose effect.

=== 1960s ===
- 1960 – Joseph Weber begins work on his bars for detecting gravitational waves.
- 1960 – Martin Kruskal and George Szekeres independently introduce the Kruskal–Szekeres coordinates for the Schwarzschild vacuum.
- 1960 – John Graves and Dieter Brill show that the Reissner–Nordström solution describe a spherical electrically charged black hole.
- 1960 – Ivor M. Robinson and Andrzej Trautman discover the Robinson-Trautman null dust solution.
- 1960 – Robert Pound and Glen Rebka test the gravitational redshift predicted by the equivalence principle to approximately 1%.
- 1961 –Tullio Regge introduces the Regge calculus.
- 1961 – Carl H. Brans and Robert H. Dicke introduce Brans–Dicke theory, the first viable alternative theory with a clear physical motivation.
- 1961 – Pascual Jordan and Jürgen Ehlers develop the kinematic decomposition of a timelike congruence,
- 1961 – Robert Dicke, Peter Roll, and R. Krotkov refine the Eötvös experiment to an accuracy of 10^{−11}.
- 1962 – John Wheeler and Robert Fuller show that the Einstein-Rosen bridge is unstable.
- 1962 – Roger Penrose and Ezra T. Newman introduce the Newman–Penrose formalism.
- 1962 – Ehlers and Wolfgang Kundt classify the symmetries of Pp-wave spacetimes.
- 1962 –Joshua Goldberg and Rainer K. Sachs prove the Goldberg–Sachs theorem.
- 1962 – Ehlers introduces Ehlers transformations, a new solution generating method,
- 1962 – Richard Arnowitt, Stanley Deser, and Charles W. Misner introduce the ADM reformulation and global hyperbolicity,
- 1962 – Istvan Ozsvath and Englbert Schücking rediscover the circularly polarized monochromomatic gravitational wave.
- 1962 – Hans Adolph Buchdahl discovers Buchdahl's theorem.
- 1962 – Hermann Bondi introduces Bondi mass.
- 1962 – Hermann Bondi, M. G. van der Burg, A. W. Metzner, and Rainer K. Sachs introduce the asymptotic symmetry group of asymptotically flat, Lorentzian spacetimes at null (i.e., light-like) infinity.
- 1962 – Riccardo Giacconi and his team discover astronomical X-ray sources.
- 1963 – Roy Kerr discovers the Kerr solution, subsequently shown by Robert Boyer and Richard Lindquist and, independently, Brandon Carter and Roger Penrose to be describing a spinning black hole.
- 1963 – Newman, T. Unti and L.A. Tamburino introduce the NUT vacuum solution,
- 1963 – Roger Penrose introduces Penrose diagrams and Penrose limits.
- 1963 – Maarten Schmidt, Jesse Greenstein, and Allan Sandage discover the first quasi-stellar radio source (QSRS), 3C273, later renamed "quasar" by Hong-Yee Chiu and shown to be moving away from Earth due to the expansion of the Universe.
- 1963 – First Texas Symposium on Relativistic Astrophysics held in Dallas, December 16–18.
- 1964 – Steven Weinberg shows that a quantum field theory of interacting massless spin-2 particles is Lorentz invariant only if it satisfies the principle of equivalence.
- 1964 – Subrahmanyan Chandrasekhar determines a stability criterion.
- 1964 – Sjur Refsdal suggests that the Hubble constant could be determined using gravitational lensing.
- 1964 – Irwin Shapiro predicts a gravitational time delay of radiation travel as a test of general relativity.
- 1965 – Roger Penrose proves the first singularity theorem.
- 1965 – Ezra Newman and others introduce Kerr-Newman metric.
- 1965 – Arno Penzias and Robert Wilson accidentally discover the cosmic microwave background radiation. This supports the Big Bang model and rules out the steady-state model of Fred Hoyle and Jayant Narlikar.
- 1967 – John Archibald Wheeler popularizes "black hole" at a conference.
- 1967 – Jocelyn Bell and Antony Hewish discover pulsars.
- 1967 – Robert H. Boyer and R. W. Lindquist introduce Boyer–Lindquist coordinates for the Kerr vacuum.
- 1967 – Bryce DeWitt publishes on canonical quantum gravity.
- 1967 – Werner Israel proves a special case of the no-hair theorem and the converse of Birkhoff's theorem.
- 1967 – Kenneth Nordtvedt develops PPN formalism.
- 1967 – Mendel Sachs publishes factorization of Einstein's field equations.
- 1967 – Hans Stephani discovers the Stephani dust solution.
- 1968 – F. J. Ernst discovers the Ernst equation.
- 1968 – B. Kent Harrison discovers the Harrison transformation, a solution-generating method.
- 1968 – Brandon Carter solves the geodesic equations for Kerr–Newmann electrovacuum with Carter's constant.
- 1968 – Hugo D. Wahlquist discovers the Wahlquist fluid.
- 1968 – James Hartle and Kip Thorne obtain the Hartle–Thorne metric.
- 1968 – Irwin Shapiro and his colleagues present the first detection of the Shapiro delay.
- 1968 – Kenneth Nordtvedt studies a possible violation of the weak equivalence principle for self-gravitating bodies and proposes a new test of the weak equivalence principle based on observing the relative motion of the Earth and Moon in the Sun's gravitational field.
- 1969 – William B. Bonnor introduces the Bonnor beam.
- 1969 – Joseph Weber reports observation of gravitational waves a claim now generally discounted.
- 1969 – Penrose proposes the (weak) cosmic censorship hypothesis and the Penrose process,
- 1969 – Misner introduces the mixmaster universe.
- 1969 – Yvonne Choquet-Bruhat and Robert Geroch discuss global aspects of the Cauchy problem in general relativity.
- 1965-70 – Subrahmanyan Chandrasekhar and colleagues develops the post-Newtonian expansions.
- 1968-70 – Roger Penrose, Stephen Hawking, and George Ellis prove that singularities must arise in the Big Bang models.

=== 1970s ===
- 1970 – Vladimir Alekseevich Belinski, Isaak Markovich Khalatnikov, and Evgeny Lifshitz introduce the BKL conjecture.
  Using a hammer and a feather on the Moon during Apollo 15, David Scott validates Galileo's claim that objects in a vacuum will fall at the same rate.
- 1970 – Stephen Hawking and Roger Penrose prove trapped surfaces must arise in black holes.
- 1970 – Richard Price discovers Price's theorem.
- 1971 – David Scott demonstrates that a hammer and a feather fall at the same rate on the Moon.
- 1971 – Alfred Goldhaber and Michael Nieto give stringent limits on the photon mass. The strictest one is $m_{\gamma} \leq 4 \times 10^{-51} \text{kg}$.
- 1971 – Stephen Hawking proves that the area of a black hole can never decrease.
- 1971 – Peter C. Aichelburg and Roman U. Sexl introduce the Aichelburg–Sexl ultraboost.
- 1971 – Introduction of the Khan–Penrose vacuum, a simple explicit colliding plane wave spacetime.
- 1971 – Robert H. Gowdy introduces the Gowdy vacuum solutions (cosmological models containing circulating gravitational waves).
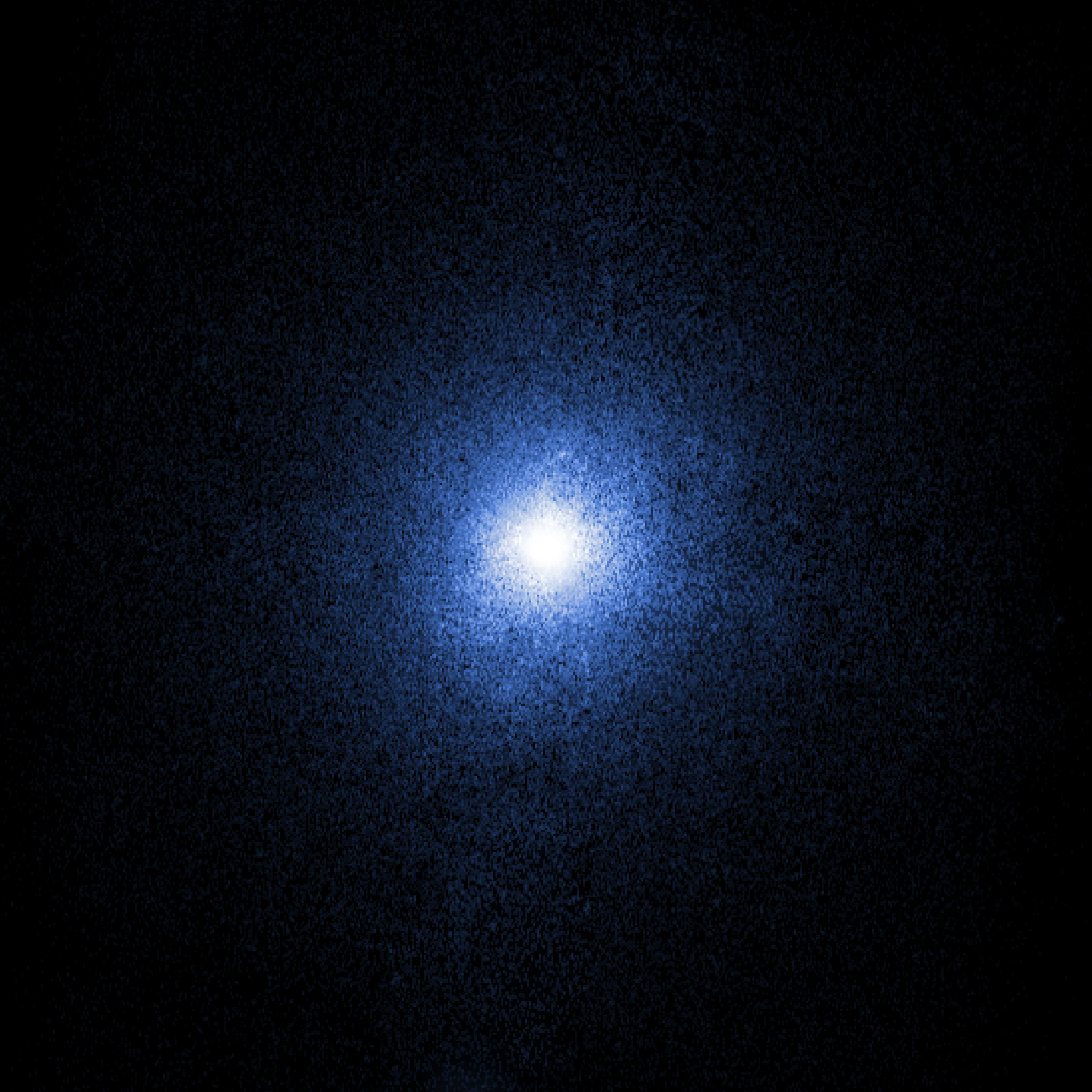
  Image of Cygnus X-1 by the Chandra X-ray Observatory (2009)
- 1971 – Cygnus X-1, the first solid black hole candidate, discovered by Uhuru satellite.
- 1971 – William H. Press discovers by numerical simulation that black holes can pulsate.
- 1971 – Robert Geroch introduces Geroch group
- 1972 – Kip Thorne states the hoop conjecture.
- 1972 – Jacob Bekenstein proposes that black holes have a non-decreasing entropy which can be identified with the area.
- 1972 – Sachs introduces optical scalars and proves peeling theorem.
- 1972 – Rainer Weiss proposes concept of gravitational-wave detector using laser interferometry in an unpublished manuscript.
- 1972 – Joseph Hafele and Richard Keating perform the Hafele–Keating experiment.
- 1972 – Saul Teukolsky derives the Teukolsky equation.
- 1972 – Yakov B. Zel'dovich and Alexei Starobinsky speculate that black holes could radiate using quantum field theory in curved spacetime.
- 1972 – James Bardeen calculates the shadow of a black hole. This is later verified by the Event Horizon Telescope.
- 1973 – Ray Klebesadel, Ian Strong, and Roy Olson report their detection of the first cosmic gamma-ray bursts.
- 1973 – Brandon Carter, Stephen Hawking, and James Bardeen propose the four laws of black hole mechanics.
- 1973 – Charles W. Misner, Kip Thorne and John Archibald Wheeler publish the treatise Gravitation, a textbook that remains in use in the twenty-first century.
- 1973 – Stephen W. Hawking and George Ellis publish the monograph The Large Scale Structure of Space-Time.
- 1973 – Robert Geroch introduces the GHP formalism.
- 1973 – Homer Ellis obtains the Ellis drainhole, the first traversable wormhole.
- 1974 – Russell Alan Hulse and Joseph Hooton Taylor Jr. discover the Hulse–Taylor binary pulsar, which they used as an indirect test of orbital decay due to gravitational radiation.
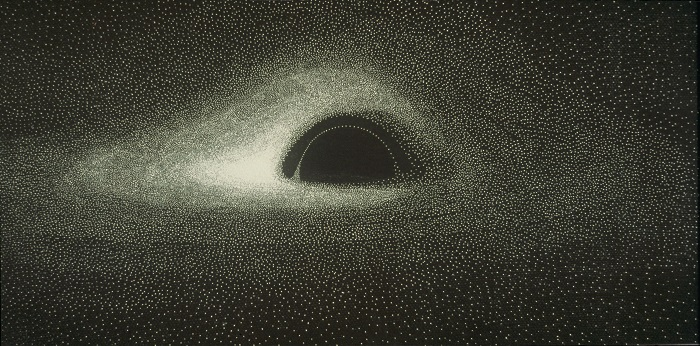
- Computer simulation of a black hole accretion disk published in 1979 by Jean-Pierre Luminet
  1974 – James W. York and Niall Ó Murchadha present the analysis of the initial value formulation and examine the stability of its solutions.
- 1974 – R. O. Hansen introduces Hansen–Geroch multipole moments.
- 1974 – Stephen Hawking discovers Hawking radiation.
- 1975 – Stephen Hawking shows that the area of a black hole is proportional to its entropy, as previously conjectured by Jacob Bekenstein.
- 1975 – Roberto Colella, Albert Overhauser, and Samuel Werner observe the quantum-mechanical phase shift of neutrons due to gravity. Neutron interferometry was later used to test the principle of equivalence.
- 1975 – Chandrasekhar and Steven Detweiler compute the effects of perturbations on a Schwarzschild black hole.
- 1977 – Roger Blandford and Roman Znajek propose the Blandford–Znajek process to explain how quasars are powered.
- 1978 – Belinskiǐ and Zakharov show how to solve Einstein's field equations using the inverse scattering transform; the first gravitational solitons,
- 1979 – Dennis Walsh, Robert Carswell, and Ray Weymann discover the gravitationally lensed quasar Q0957+561.
- 1979 – Jean-Pierre Luminet creates an image of a black hole with an accretion disk using computer simulation.
- 1979 – Steven Detweiler proposes using pulsar timing arrays to detect gravitational waves.
- 1979-81 – Richard Schoen and Shing-Tung Yau prove the positive mass theorem. Edward Witten independently proves the same thing.

=== 1980s ===
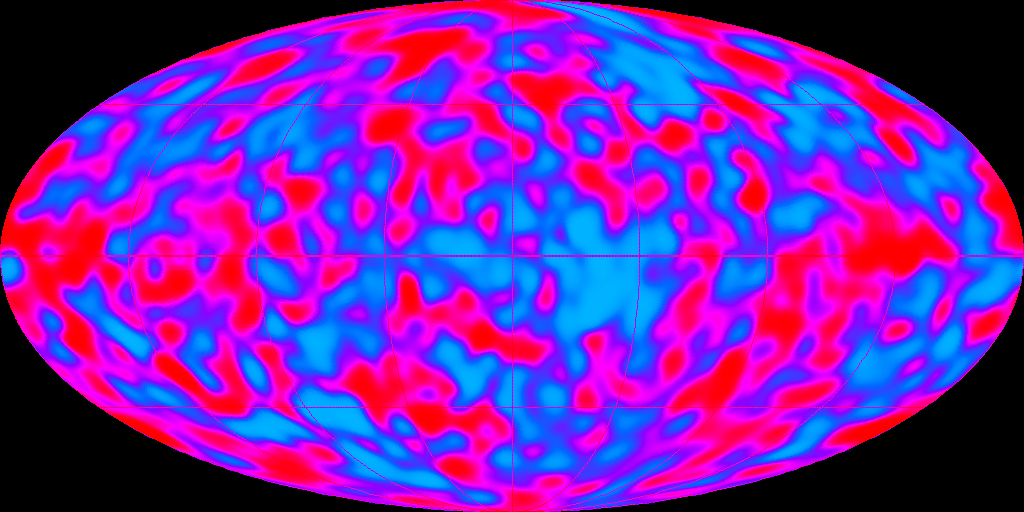
Variations in the temperature of the cosmic microwave background measured by the COBE satellite. The plane of the Milky Way Galaxy is horizontal across the middle of each picture.

- 1980 – Vera Rubin and colleagues study the rotational properties of UGC 2885, demonstrating the prevalence of dark matter.
- 1980 – Gravity Probe A verifies gravitational redshift to approximately 0.007% using a space-born hydrogen maser.
- 1980 – James Bardeen explains structure in the Universe using cosmological perturbation theory.
- 1981 – Alan Guth proposes cosmic inflation in order to solve the flatness and horizon problems.
- 1982 – Joseph Taylor and Joel Weisberg show that the rate of energy loss from the binary pulsar PSR B1913+16 agrees with that predicted by the general relativistic quadrupole formula to within 5%.
- 1983 – James Hartle and Stephen Hawking propose the no-boundary wave function for the Universe.
- 1983-84 – RELIKT-1 observes the cosmic microwave background.
- 1984 – The U.S. National Science Foundation agrees to fund the Laser Interferometer Gravitational-wave Observatory (LIGO) project.
- 1986 – Helmut Friedrich proves that the de Sitter spacetime is stable.
- 1986 – Bernard Schutz shows that cosmic distances can be determined using sources of gravitational waves without references to the cosmic distance ladder. Standard-siren astronomy is born.
- 1988 – Mike Morris, Kip Thorne, and Yurtsever Ulvi obtain the Morris-Thorne wormhole. Morris and Thorne argue for its pedagogical value.
- 1989 – Steven Weinberg discusses the cosmological constant problem, the discrepancy between the measured value and those predicted by modern theories of elementary particles.
- 1989-93 – The Cosmic Background Explorer (COBE) identifies anisotropy in the cosmic microwave background.

=== 1990s ===
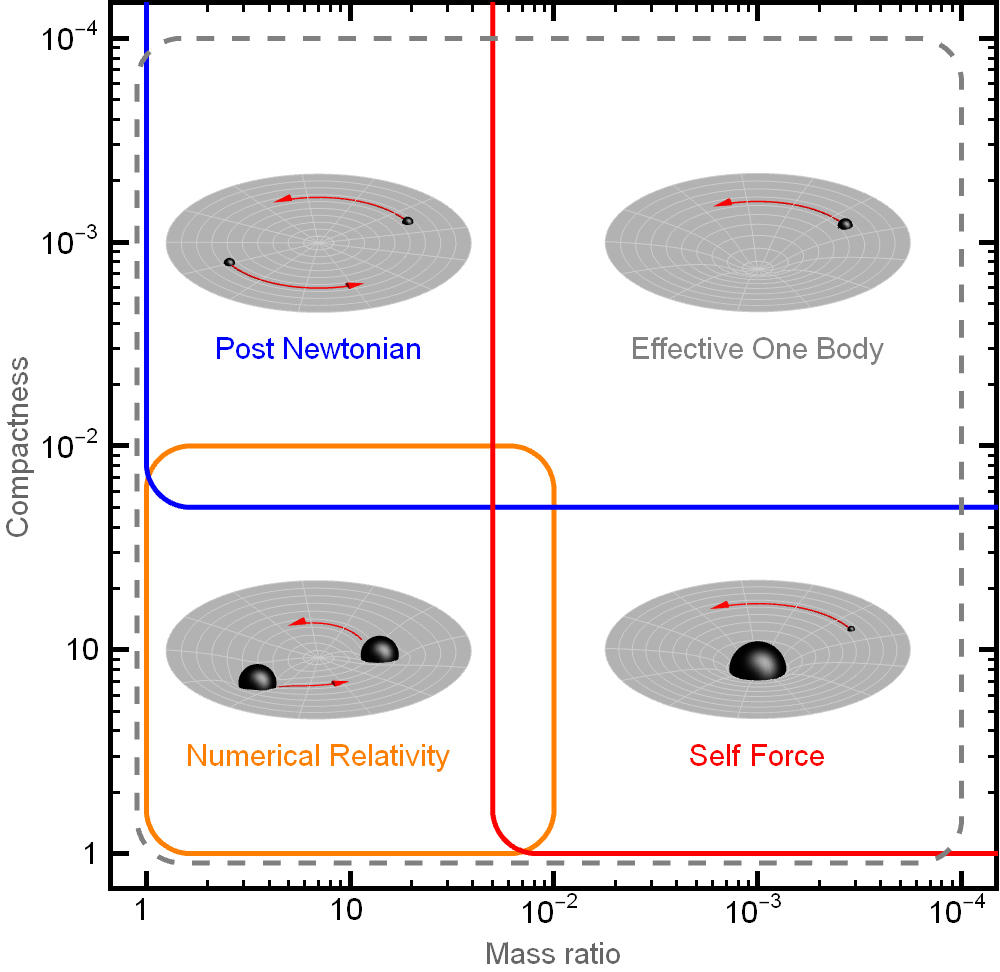
Parameter space of various approximation techniques in general relativity

- 1992 – Stephen Hawking states his chronology protection conjecture.
- 1993 – Demetrios Christodoulou and Sergiu Klainerman prove the non-linear stability of the Minkowski spacetime.
- 1995 – John F. Donoghue shows that general relativity is a quantum effective field theory. This framework could be used to analyze binary systems observed by gravitational-wave observatories.
- 1995 – Hubble Deep Field image taken. It is a landmark in the study of cosmology.
- 1998 – The first complete Einstein ring, B1938+666, discovered using the Hubble Space Telescope and MERLIN.
- 1998-99 – Scientists discover that the expansion of the Universe is accelerating.
- 1999 – Alessandra Buonanno and Thibault Damour introduce the effective one-body formalism. This is later used to analyze data collected by gravitational-wave observatories.

== 2000s ==
- 2003 – Arvind Borde, Alan Guth, and Alexander Vilenkin prove the Borde–Guth–Vilenkin theorem.
- 2002 – First data collection of the Laser Interferometer Gravitational-Wave Observatory (LIGO).
- 2002 – James Williams, Slava Turyshev, and Dale Boggs conduct stringent lunar test of violations of the principle of equivalence.
- 2005 – Daniel Holz and Scott Hughes coin the term "standard sirens" in their study of gravitational waves.
- 2005 – Frans Pretorius wrote the first computer simulation of merging black holes, a significant step in the development of numerical relativity.
- 2009 – Gravity Probe B experiment verifies the geodetic effect and frame-dragging.

=== 2010s ===
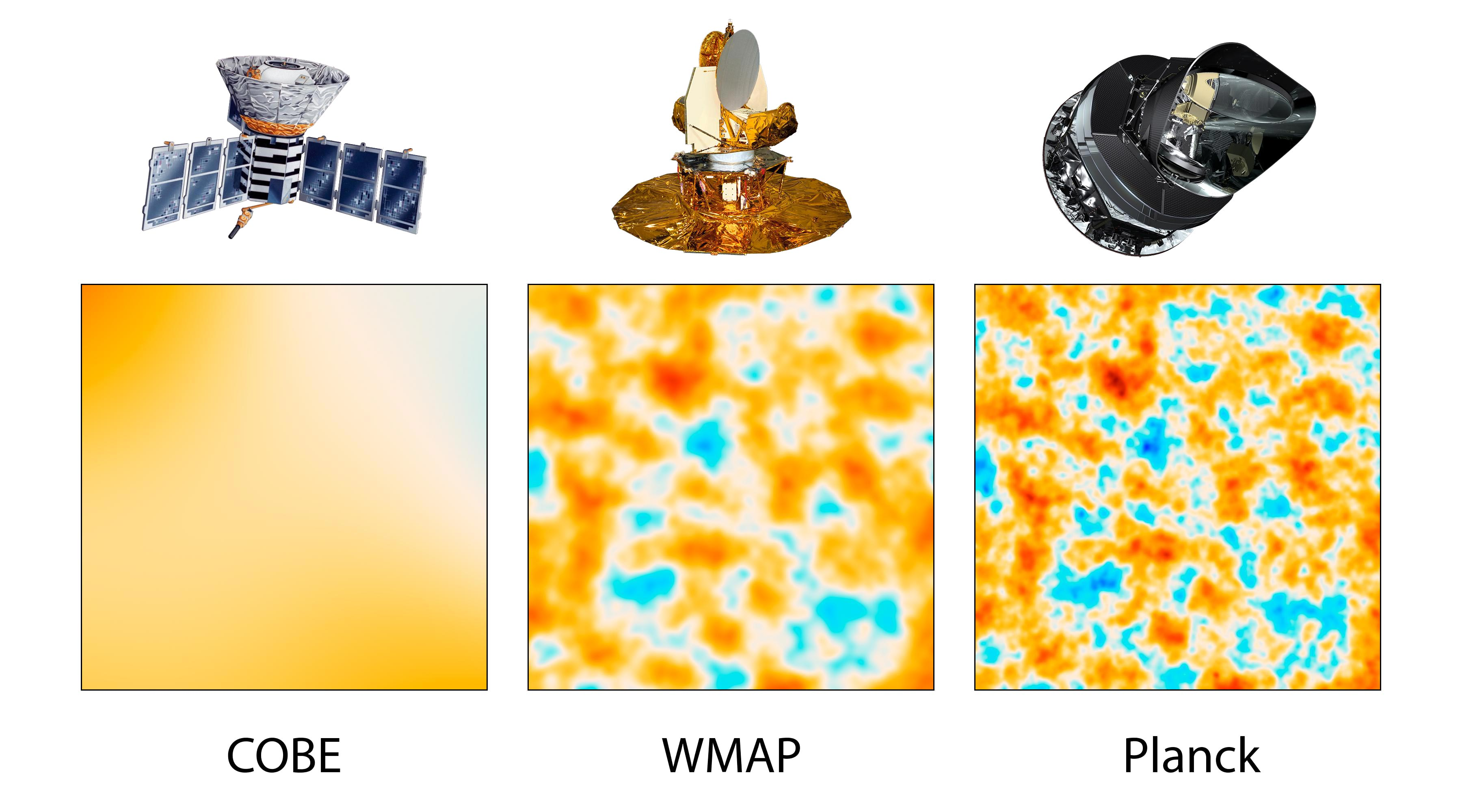
Improving cosmological measurements by three different satellites

- 2010 – A team at the U.S. National Institute for Standards and Technology (NIST) verifies relativistic time dilation using optical atomic clocks.
- 2011 – Wilkinson Microwave Anisotropy Probe (WMAP) finds no statistically significant deviations from the ΛCDM model of cosmology.
- 2012 – Hubble Ultra-Deep Field image released. It was created using data collected by the Hubble Space Telescope between 2003 and 2004.
- 2013 – NuSTAR and XMM-Newton measure the spin of the supermassive black hole at the center of the galaxy NGC 1365.
- 2015 – Advanced LIGO reports the first direct detections of gravitational waves, GW150914 and GW151226, mergers of stellar-mass black holes. Gravitational-wave astronomy is born. No deviations from general relativity were found.
- 2017 – LIGO-VIRGO collaboration detects gravitational waves emitted by a neutron-star binary, GW170817. The Fermi Gamma-ray Space Telescope and the International Gamma-ray Astrophysics Laboratory (INTEGRAL) unambiguously detect the corresponding gamma-ray burst. LIGO-VIRGO and Fermi constrain the difference between the speed of gravity and the speed of light in vacuum to 10^{−15}. This marks the first time electromagnetic and gravitational waves are detected from a single source, and give direct evidence that some (short) gamma-ray bursts are due to colliding neutron stars.
- 2017 – Multi-messenger astronomy reveals neutron-star mergers to be responsible for the nucleosynthesis of some heavy elements, such as strontium, via the rapid-neutron capture or r-process. Subsequent analyses indicate the presence of yttrium, lanthanum, and cerium.
- 2017 – MICROSCOPE satellite experiment verifies the principle of equivalence to 10^{−15} in terms of the Eötvös ratio $\eta$. The final report is published in 2022.
- 2017 – Principle of equivalence tested to 10^{−9} for atoms in a coherent state of superposition.
- 2017 – Scientists begin using gravitational-wave sources as "standard sirens" to measure the Hubble constant, finding its value to be broadly in line with the best estimates of the time. An improved result is published in 2019. Refinements of this technique will help resolve discrepancies between the different methods of measurements.
- 2017 – Neutron Star Interior Composition Explorer (NICER) arrives on the International Space Station.
- 2017-18 – Georgios Moschidis proves the instability of the anti-de Sitter spacetime.
- 2018 – Final paper by the Planck satellite collaboration. Planck operated between 2009 and 2013.
- 2018 – Mihalis Dafermos and Jonathan Luk disprove the strong cosmic censorship hypothesis for the Cauchy horizon of an uncharged, rotating black hole.
- 2018 – European Southern Observatory (ESO) observes gravitational redshift of radiation emitted by matter orbiting Sagittarius A*, the central supermassive black hole of the Milky Way, and verifies the innermost stable circular orbit for that object.
- 2018 – Advanced LIGO-VIRGO collaboration constrains equations of state for a neutron star using GW170817.
- 2018 – Luciano Rezzolla, Elias R. Most, and Lukas R. Weih used gravitational-wave data from GW170817 constrain the possible maximum mass for a neutron star to around 2.01 to 2.16 $M_{\odot}$ (solar masses).
- 2018 – Kris Pardo, Maya Fishbach, Daniel Holz, and David Spergel limit the number of spacetime dimensions through which gravitational waves can propagate to 3 + 1, in line with general relativity and ruling out models that allow for "leakage" to higher dimensions of space. Analyses of GW170817 have also ruled out many alternatives to general relativity, such as scalar-tensor theory and bimetric gravity, and proposals for dark energy.
- 2018 – Two different experimental teams report highly precise values of Newton's gravitational constant $G$ that slightly disagree.
- 2019 – Event Horizon Telescope (EHT) releases an image of supermassive black hole M87*, and measures its mass and shadow. Results are confirmed in 2024.
- 2019 – Advanced LIGO and VIRGO detect GW190814, the collision of a 26-solar-mass black hole and a 2.6-solar-mass object, either an extremely heavy neutron star or a very light black hole. This is the largest mass gap seen in a gravitational-wave source to-date.

=== 2020s ===
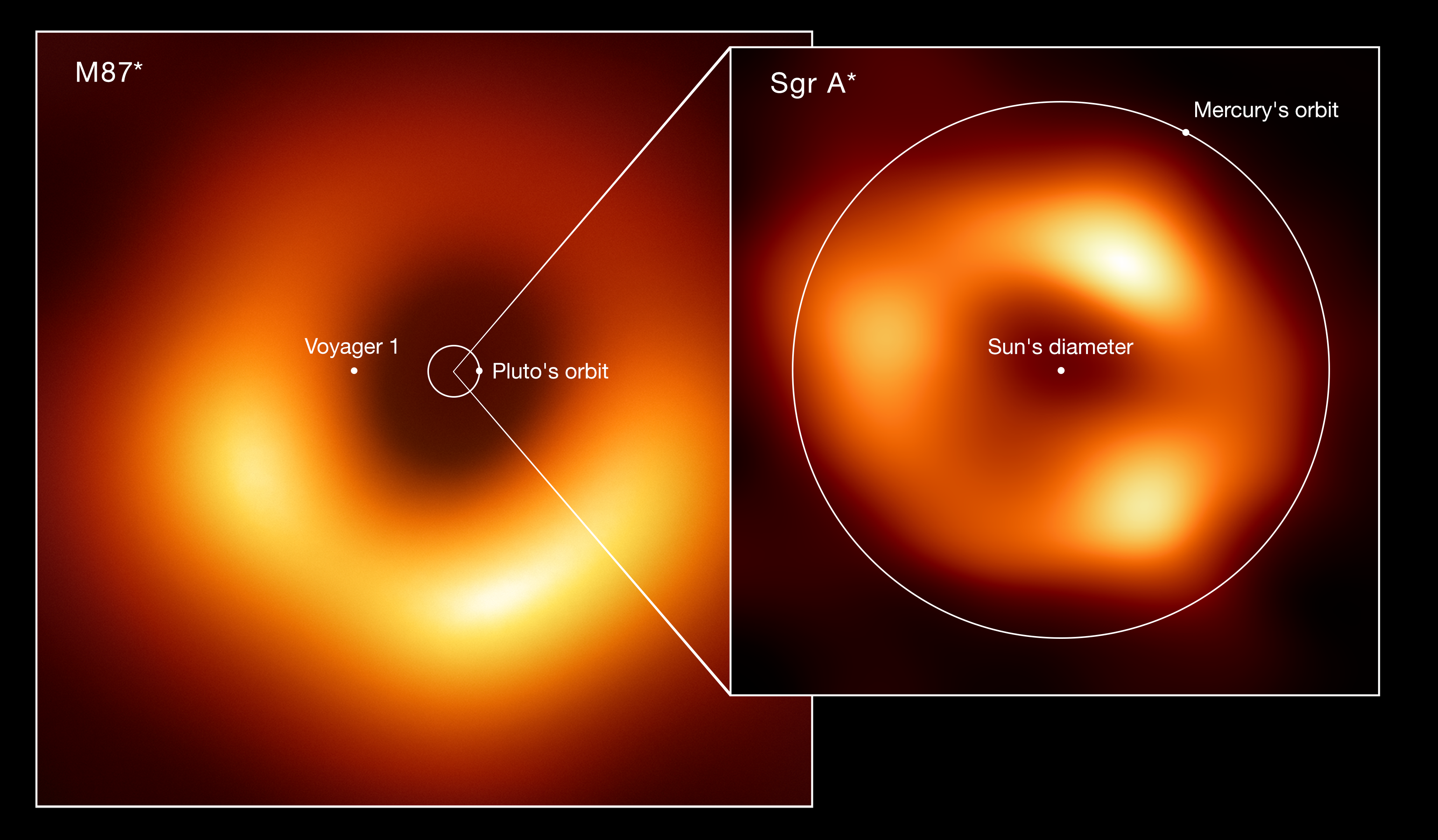
The size of Sagittarius A* is smaller than the orbit of Mercury.

- 2020 – Principle of equivalence tested for individual atoms using atomic interferometry to ~10^{−12}.
- 2020 – ESO observes Schwarzschild precession of the star S2 about Sagittarius A*.
- 2021 – Jun Ye and his team measure gravitational redshift with an accuracy of 7.6 × 10^{−21} using an ultracold cloud of 100,000 strontium atoms in an optical lattice.
- 2021 – EHT measures the polarization of the ring of M87*, and other properties of the magnetic field in its vicinity.
- 2021 – EHT releases an image of Sagittarius A*, measures its shadow, and shows that it is accurately described by the Kerr metric.
- 2022 – Chris Overstreet and his team observe the gravitational Aharonov-Bohm effect using an experimental design from 2012.
- 2022 – James Webb Space Telescope (JWST) publishes its first image, a deep-field photograph of the SMACS 0723 galaxy cluster.
- 2022 – Neil Gehrels Swift Observatory detects GRB 221009A, the brightest gamma-ray burst recorded.
- 2022 – JWST identifies several candidate high-redshift objects, corresponding to just a few hundred million years after the Big Bang.
- 2023 – James Nightingale and colleagues detect Abell 1201, an ultramassive black hole (33 billion $M_{\odot}$), using strong gravitational lensing.
- 2023 – Matteo Bachetti and colleagues confirm that neutron star M82 X-2 is violating the Eddington limit, making it an ultraluminous X-ray source (ULX).
- 2023 – Team led by Dong Sheng and Zheng-Tian Lu found a null result for the coupling between quantum spin and gravity to 10^{−9}.
- 2023 – The North American Nanohertz Observatory for Gravitational Waves (NANOGrav), the European Pulsar Timing Array (EPTA), the Parkes Pulsar Timing Array (Australia), and the Chinese Pulsar Timing Array report detection of a gravitational-wave background.
- 2023 – Geraint F. Lewis and Brendon Brewer present evidence of cosmological time dilation in quasars.
- 2023 – CERN demonstrates by experiment that antimatter obeys the weak principle of equivalence, meaning it does not have antigravitational properties.
- 2024 – The Large High Altitude Air Shower Observatory (LHAASO) collaboration imposes stringent limits on violations of Lorentz invariance proposed in certain theories of quantum gravity using GRB 221009A.
- 2024 – Álvaro Álvarez-Domínguez, Luis J. Garay, Eduardo Martín-Martínez, and José Polo-Gómez show that quantum electrodynamics prevents a kugelblitz from forming.
- 2025 – Team led by Dominik Hornof observe the Terrell-Penrose rotation by using ultra-fast laser pulses and photography to virtually reduce the speed of light.
- 2025 – LIGO-VIRGO-KAGRA collaboration verifies Hawking's area theorem for two merging black holes with GW250114, the clearest gravitational-wave signal to-date. Alternatives to general relativity are further constrained.

== See also ==
- Timeline of black hole physics
- Timeline of special relativity and the speed of light
- List of contributors to general relativity
- List of scientific publications by Albert Einstein
