= Gravitational plane wave =

Solution to Einstein field equations

In general relativity, a gravitational plane wave (or plane gravitational wave) is defined to be any non-flat solution to Einstein's empty space-time field equations, which has the same symmetries as a plane electromagnetic wave. They are a special class of a vacuum pp-wave spacetime.

In the early years of general relativity theory, the existence of gravitational waves was hotly debated, as after theorizing them, Einstein and Nathan Rosen came to the erroneous conclusion in 1936 that gravitational plane waves do not exist. However, not every physicist was convinced as, after Rosen left for the Soviet Union, Einstein's new assistant Leopold Infeld and the physicist Howard P. Robertson showed Einstein that his and Rosen's conclusion was incorrect and, with his help, rigorously proved that gravitational cylindrical waves exist. This led to continued debate on the nature of gravitational waves and the troubles of defining them in Cartesian coordinates for mathematical simplicity rather than physical convenience, until in 1956 Felix Pirani wrote a paper which demonstrated a mathematical formalism to show how gravitational waves moved particles back and forth in their own coordinate systems, bypassing the issue.

In 1957, there was a conference on the role of gravitation in physics known as the Chapel Hill Conference in the North Carolina town of the same name, where Pirani presented this paper and, from its findings, the physicist Richard Faynman suggested a thought experiment called the sticky bead argument which demonstrated that gravitational waves must carry energy. This argument formed the basis of the papers that Hermann Bondi would go on to write after this conference which would prove the existence of the gravitational plane wave.

== Coordinate Systems ==
In general relativity, they may be defined in terms of Brinkmann coordinates by

$g = \delta_{ij}dX^idX^j + 2dUdV + K_{ij}(U)dX^idX^jdU^2$

Where $K_{ij}(U)$ is a symmetric and trace less 2 x 2 matrix which controls the waveform of the two possible polarization modes of gravitational radiation. In this context, these two modes are usually called the plus mode and cross mode, respectively. The plus mode is characterized by the equation

$K_{ij}(U) = \frac{1}{2} A(U)diag(1,-1)$

where $A(U)$ represents an arbitrary function.

== See also ==
- Einstein–Rosen waves
- Vacuum solution (general relativity)
- Gravitational wave background
