= Bonnor =

Bonnor may refer to:

- George Bonnor (1855–1912), Australian cricketer
- William B. Bonnor (1920–2015), mathematician and gravitation physicist
  - Bonnor beam

== See also ==
- James Bonnor Middleton (1865–1913), South African cricketer
