= Sticky bead argument =

Thought experiment in physics

In general relativity, the sticky bead argument is a simple thought experiment designed to show that gravitational radiation is indeed predicted by general relativity and can have physical effects. These claims were not widely accepted prior to about 1955, but after the introduction of the bead argument, any remaining doubts soon disappeared from the research literature.

The argument is often credited to Hermann Bondi, who popularized it, but it was originally proposed by Richard Feynman.

== Description ==
The thought experiment was first described by Feynman at the 1957 Chapel Hill Conference, and later addressed in his private letter to Victor Weisskopf:

Feynman’s gravitational wave detector: It is simply two beads sliding freely (but with a small amount of friction) on a rigid rod. As the wave passes over the rod, atomic forces hold the length of the rod fixed, but the proper distance between the two beads oscillates. Thus, the beads rub against the rod, dissipating heat.

As the gravitational waves are mainly transverse, the rod has to be oriented perpendicular to the propagation direction of the wave.

== History of arguments on the properties of gravitational waves ==
=== Einstein's double reversal ===
The creator of the theory of general relativity, Albert Einstein, argued in 1916 that gravitational radiation should be produced, according to his theory, by any mass-energy configuration that has a time-varying quadrupole moment (or higher multipole moment). Using a linearized field equation (appropriate for the study of weak gravitational fields), he derived the famous quadrupole formula quantifying the rate at which such radiation should carry away energy. Examples of systems with time varying quadrupole moments include vibrating strings, bars rotating about an axis perpendicular to the symmetry axis of the bar, and binary star systems, but not rotating disks.

In 1922, Arthur Stanley Eddington wrote a paper expressing (apparently for the first time) the view that gravitational waves are in essence ripples in coordinates, and have no physical meaning. He did not appreciate Einstein's arguments that the waves are real.

In 1936, together with Nathan Rosen, Einstein rediscovered the Beck vacuums, a family of exact gravitational wave solutions with cylindrical symmetry (sometimes also called Einstein–Rosen waves). While investigating the motion of test particles in these solutions, Einstein and Rosen became convinced that gravitational waves were unstable to collapse. Einstein reversed himself and declared that gravitational radiation was not after all a prediction of his theory. Einstein wrote to his friend Max Born

Together with a young collaborator, I arrived at the interesting result that gravitational waves do not exist, though they had been assumed a certainty to the first approximation. This shows that the nonlinear field equations can show us more, or rather limit us more, than we have believed up till now.

In other words, Einstein believed that he and Rosen had established that their new argument showed that the prediction of gravitational radiation was a mathematical artifact of the linear approximation he had employed in 1916. Einstein believed these plane waves would gravitationally collapse into points; he had long hoped something like this would explain quantum mechanical wave-particle duality.

Einstein and Rosen accordingly submitted a paper entitled Do gravitational waves exist? to a leading physics journal, Physical Review, in which they described their wave solutions and concluded that the "radiation" that seemed to appear in general relativity was not genuine radiation capable of transporting energy or having (in principle) measurable physical effects. The anonymous referee, who—as the current editor of Physical Review recently confirmed, all parties now being deceased—was the combative cosmologist, Howard Percy Robertson, pointed out the error described below, and the manuscript was returned to the authors with a note from the editor asking them to revise the paper to address these concerns. Quite uncharacteristically, Einstein took this criticism very badly, angrily replying "I see no reason to address the, in any case erroneous, opinion expressed by your referee." He vowed never again to submit a paper to Physical Review. Instead, Einstein and Rosen resubmitted the paper without change to another and much less well known journal, The Journal of the Franklin Institute. He kept his vow regarding Physical Review.

Leopold Infeld, who arrived at Princeton University at this time, later remembered his utter astonishment on hearing of this development, since radiation is such an essential element for any classical field theory worthy of the name. Infeld expressed his doubts to a leading expert on general relativity: H. P. Robertson, who had just returned from a visit to Caltech. Going over the argument as Infeld remembered it, Robertson was able to show Infeld the mistake: locally, the Einstein–Rosen waves are gravitational plane waves. Einstein and Rosen had correctly shown that a cloud of test particles would, in sinusoidal plane waves, form caustics, but changing to another chart (essentially the Brinkmann coordinates) shows that the formation of the caustic is not a contradiction at all, but in fact just what one would expect in this situation. Infeld then approached Einstein, who concurred with Robertson's analysis (still not knowing it was he who reviewed the Physical Review submission).

Since Rosen had recently departed for the Soviet Union, Einstein acted alone in promptly and thoroughly revising their joint paper. This third version was retitled On gravitational waves, and, following Robertson's suggestion of a transformation to cylindrical coordinates, presented what are now called Einstein–Rosen cylindrical waves (these are locally isometric to plane waves). This is the version that eventually appeared. However, Rosen was unhappy with this revision and eventually published his own version, which retained the erroneous "disproof" of the prediction of gravitational radiation.

In a letter to the editor of Physical Review, Robertson wryly reported that in the end, Einstein had fully accepted the objections that had initially so upset him.

=== Bern and Chapel Hill conferences ===
In 1955, an important conference honoring the semi-centennial of special relativity was held in Bern, the Swiss capital city where Einstein was working in the famous patent office during the Annus mirabilis. Rosen attended and gave a talk in which he computed the Einstein pseudotensor and Landau–Lifshitz pseudotensor (two alternative, non-covariant, descriptions of the energy carried by a gravitational field, a notion that is notoriously difficult to pin down in general relativity). These turn out to be zero for the Einstein–Rosen waves, and Rosen argued that this reaffirmed the negative conclusion he had reached with Einstein in 1936.

However, by this time a few physicists, such as Felix Pirani and Ivor Robinson, had come to appreciate the role played by curvature in producing tidal accelerations, and were able to convince many peers that gravitational radiation would indeed be produced, at least in cases such as a vibrating spring where different pieces of the system were clearly not in inertial motion. Nonetheless, some physicists continued to doubt whether radiation would be produced by a binary star system, where the world lines of the centers of mass of the two stars should, according to the EIH approximation (dating from 1938 and due to Einstein, Infeld, and Banesh Hoffmann), follow timelike geodesics.

Inspired by conversations by Felix Pirani, Hermann Bondi took up the study of gravitational radiation, in particular the question of quantifying the energy and momentum carried off 'to infinity' by a radiating system. During the next few years, Bondi developed the Bondi radiating chart and the notion of Bondi energy to rigorously study this question in maximal generality.

In 1957, at a conference at Chapel Hill, North Carolina, appealing to various mathematical tools developed by John Lighton Synge, A. Z. Petrov and André Lichnerowicz, Pirani explained more clearly than had previously been possible the central role played by the Riemann tensor and in particular the tidal tensor in general relativity. He gave the first correct description of the relative (tidal) acceleration of initially mutually static test particles that encounter a sinusoidal gravitational plane wave.

=== Feynman's argument ===
Later in the Chapel Hill conference, Richard Feynman used Pirani's description to point out that a passing gravitational wave should, in principle, cause a bead on a stick (oriented transversely to the direction of propagation of the wave) to slide back and forth, thus heating the bead and the stick by friction. This heating, said Feynman, showed that the wave did indeed impart energy to the bead and stick system, so it must indeed transport energy, contrary to the view expressed in 1955 by Rosen.

In two 1957 papers, Bondi and (separately) Joseph Weber and John Archibald Wheeler used this bead argument to present detailed refutations of Rosen's argument.

=== Rosen's final views ===
Nathan Rosen continued to argue as late as the 1970s, on the basis of a supposed paradox involving the radiation reaction, that gravitational radiation is not in fact predicted by general relativity. His arguments were generally regarded as invalid, but in any case the sticky bead argument had by then long since convinced other physicists of the reality of the prediction of gravitational radiation.

== See also ==
- Dashpot, of which the sticky-bead device is a variant.
- Monochromatic electromagnetic plane wave and monochromatic gravitational plane wave, for a modern account of two exact solutions, which should clarify the point that confused Einstein and Rosen in 1936.
- pp-wave spacetime, for the Brinkmann gravitational wave solutions.
- Gravitational plane wave, for the Baldwin–Jeffery gravitational plane wave solutions.
- Brinkmann coordinates and Rosen coordinates for the two coordinate charts.
- Beck vacuums, for the Beck or Einstein–Rosen family of vacuum solutions.
