= Einstein–Rosen metric =

Exact gravitational-wave solution to Einstein's field equations

In general relativity, the Einstein–Rosen metric is an exact solution to the Einstein field equations derived in 1937 by Albert Einstein and Nathan Rosen describing cylindrical gravitational waves.

Einstein first predicted the existence of gravitational waves in 1916. He returned to the problem 20 years later, working with his assistant, Rosen. Einstein and Rosen thought that they had found a proof for the non-existence of gravitational waves. But an anonymous reviewer—posthumously revealed to be Howard Percy Robertson—pointed out their misunderstanding of the coordinates they were using. Einstein and Rosen resolved this issue and reached the opposite conclusion, exhibiting the first exact solution to field equations of general relativity describing gravitational waves.

This metric can be written in a form such that the Belinski–Zakharov transform applies, and thus has the form of a gravitational soliton. In 1972 and 1973, J. R. Rao, A. R. Roy, and R. N. Tiwari published a class of exact solutions involving the Einstein–Rosen metric. In 2021 Robert F. Penna found an algebraic derivation of the Einstein–Rosen metric, using the Geroch group.

== Description of the metric ==
The Einstein–Rosen metric (with $c=1$) is given by

$$ds^2=e^{2\nu}[(dt)^2-(d\rho)^2] - e^{-2\mu}(\rho d\varphi)^2 - e^{2\mu} (dz)^2$$

where $\mu=\mu(t,\rho)$ and $\nu=\nu(t,\rho)$ satisfy

$$\mu_{tt} = \frac{1}{\rho}(\rho\mu_{\rho})_{\rho},$$
$$(\nu +\mu)_{t} = 2\mu_t\mu_\rho,$$
$$(\nu +\mu)_{\rho} =(\mu_t^2 + \mu_\rho^2),$$

in which the integrability of the function $\nu +\mu$ is guaranteed. A simple separable solution is given by

$$\mu = A J_0(\sigma \rho) \cos \sigma t,$$
$$\nu+\mu = \frac{A^2}{2}  [\sigma^2\rho^2 (J_0^2+J_1^2) - 2\sigma \rho J_0 J_1 \cos^2\sigma t],$$

where $A$ is a constant, $\sigma$ is the frequency and $J_n$ is the Bessel function. For Einstein–Rosen waves, the C-energy, defined to be $C=\nu+\mu$, is not constant in time and oscillates periodically.

In the general case, one can write

$$\mu = \sum_j [A_j J_0(\sigma_j \rho) \cos \sigma_j t + B_j J_0(\sigma_j \rho) \sin \sigma_j t].$$

Suppose $B_j=0$, i.e., $\mu$ is given by the cosine series, then we have

$$\begin{align}\nu+\mu &=  \frac{1}{2} \sum_j A_j^2 \{ \sigma_j^2\rho^2 [J_0^2(\sigma_j\rho)+J_1^2(\sigma_j\rho)]-2\sigma_j\rho J_0(\sigma_j\rho)J_1(\sigma_j\rho)\cos^2\sigma_j t\}\\
& - \rho \sum_{j<k}A_jA_k \frac{\sigma_j\sigma_k}{\sigma_j+\sigma_k} [J_0(\sigma_j\rho) J_1(\sigma_k\rho) + J_0(\sigma_k\rho) J_1(\sigma_j\rho)] \cos(\sigma_j+\sigma_k)t \\
&- \rho \sum_{j<k} A_jA_k \frac{\sigma_j\sigma_k}{\sigma_j-\sigma_k} [J_0(\sigma_j\rho) J_1(\sigma_k\rho) - J_0(\sigma_k\rho) J_1(\sigma_j\rho)]\cos(\sigma_j-\sigma_k) t.
\end{align}$$

== See also ==
- Gravitational plane wave
- Pp-wave spacetime
