= Chapel Hill Conference =

1957 international physics conference

The Conference on the Role of Gravitation in Physics, better known as the Chapel Hill Conference or GR1, was an invitation-only international scientific conference held at Chapel Hill, North Carolina, United States, from January 18 to January 23, 1957. Attendees discussed topics in gravitational physics, including (classical) general relativity, gravitational waves, radio astronomy, cosmology, and quantum gravity. It was also the first conference where the many-worlds interpretation was discussed.

The Chapel Hill Conference (GR1) one of the first in an ongoing series of modern conferences on gravitation, referred to as GRn. It followed the one convened in Bern, Switzerland, on the 50th anniversary of special relativity, GR0, taking place just a few months after the death of Albert Einstein. After the Chapel Hill Conference, conferences on general relativity and gravitation much larger gatherings, fueled by advances in observational astronomy; the discovery of pulsars, quasars, X-ray sources, the cosmic microwave background, and the first black-hole candidate (Cygnus X-1); among other developments. By the 1980s, conferences of this kind had hundreds of attendees from dozens of countries worldwide.

According to historian of physics Dean Rickles, the Chapel Hill Conference revived interest in general relativity, similar to what the 1947 Shelter Island Conference did for quantum field theory. Physicist Dennis Sciama explained its significance thus, "This was the real beginning on one sense, that is, it brought together isolated people, showed that they had reached a common set of problems, and inspired them to continue working. The 'relativity family' was born then."

== Organization ==
The conference was organized by the Institute of Field Physics established a year before the conference in the University of North Carolina at Chapel Hill. The institute was financed by industrialist Agnew Hunter Bahnson.

The conference was organized by physicists Cécile DeWitt-Morette and Bryce DeWitt. Aside from the DeWitts, in the steering committee there was also Frederik Belinfante, Peter Bergmann, Freeman Dyson and John Archibald Wheeler.

The conference was divided into 4 sessions on unquantized general relativity, a single session on cosmology, and 3 sessions on quantum gravity.

== Discussed topics ==
=== Lack of new experiments ===
After the introductory lecture by Wheeler, Robert H. Dicke reviewed the experimental tests of general relativity. He concluded that there was not much progress, he contrasted it with quantum mechanics:

It is unfortunate to note that the situation with respect to the experimental checks of general relativity theory is not much better than it was a few years after the theory was discovered—say in 1920. This is in striking contrast to the situation with respect to quantum theory, where we have literally thousands of experimental checks... Professor Wheeler has already discussed the three famous checks of general relativity; this is really very flimsy evidence on which to hang a theory.

Dicke discussed the Eötvös experiment and provided ideas for further experiments.

=== Gravitational waves ===
During the conference, the nature of gravitational waves and their ability to transfer energy was discussed. Richard Feynman remembers

"I was surprised to find a whole day at the conference devoted to this question, and that ‘experts’ were confused. That is what comes from looking for conserved energy tensors, etc. instead of asking ‘can the waves do work?"

Felix Pirani presented for the first time how to mathematically treat gravitational waves using the geodesic deviation introduced by John Lighton Synge. He showed how two masses would move relative from each other from ripples in spacetime. Based on Pirani's argument, Feynman suggested during the conference the sticky bead argument which intuitively demonstrated that gravitational waves must carry energy. A version of this argument was published by Hermann Bondi right after the conference.

=== Wormholes ===
During the conference, Wheeler coined the term wormhole.

=== Numerical relativity ===
When discussing the presentations of Yvonne Fourès-Bruhat and Charles W. Misner, Bryce DeWitt pointed out the importance of using computers to solve Einstein field equations. This line of research led to the development of numerical relativity.

=== Many-worlds interpretation ===
The relative state formulation, better known today as the many-worlds interpretation of quantum mechanics, was being developed by Hugh Everett III, a student of Wheeler, who submitted an edited version of his thesis for the conference but did not attend. The paper was well received by Bryce DeWitt. Wheeler and Charles W. Misner presented some of Everett's ideas near the end of the conference. Feynman publicly criticized the idea of an universal wave function, suggested by Wheeler, saying

"The concept of a 'universal wave function' has serious difficulties. This is so since the function must contain amplitudes for all possible worlds depending upon all quantum mechanical possibilities in the past and thus one is forced to believe in the equal reality of an infinity of possible worlds."

Everett's paper was published in the proceedings of the conference.

== List of participants ==
The list of participants according to DeWitt-Morette report is:

- From United States:
  - James Leroy Anderson (born 1926)
  - Valentine Bargmann
  - Robert W. Bass (born 1930)
  - Frederik Belinfante
  - Peter Bergmann
  - Dieter R. Brill (born 1933)
  - Michael J. Buckingham (born 1927)
  - William R. Davis (PhD in 1956)
  - Bryce DeWitt
  - Cécile DeWitt-Morette
  - Robert H. Dicke
  - Frederick J. Ernst (born 1932)
  - Richard Feynman
  - Thomas Gold
  - Joshua N. Goldberg
  - Arthur Lilley (born 1928)
  - Richard W. Lindquist (PhD in 1962)
  - Charles W. Misner
  - Raymond Mjolsness (PhD in 1963)
  - Ezra T. Newman
  - Alfred Schild
  - Ralph S. Schiller
  - Joseph Weber
  - John Archibald Wheeler
  - Louis Witten
- From United Kingdom:
  - Hermann Bondi
  - Felix Pirani
  - Léon Rosenfeld
  - Dennis W. Sciama
- From France:
  - Yvonne Fourès-Bruhat
  - André Lichnerowicz
  - Marie-Antoinette Tonnelat
- From Germany:
  - Helmut Salecker
- From Japan:
  - Ryoyu Utiyama
- From Denmark:
  - Stanley Deser
- From Sweden
  - Bertel Laurent
- From Turkey
  - Behram Kurşunoğlu

Nathan Rosen was invited but did not participate.

== See also ==
- Texas Symposium on Relativistic Astrophysics
- Timeline of gravitational physics and relativity
