= Aichelburg–Sexl ultraboost =

Exact solution in general relativity

In general relativity, the Aichelburg–Sexl ultraboost is an exact solution which models the spacetime of an observer moving towards or away from a spherically symmetric gravitating object at nearly the speed of light. It was introduced by Peter C. Aichelburg and Roman U. Sexl in 1971.

The original motivation behind the ultraboost was to consider the gravitational field of massless point particles within general relativity. It can be considered an approximation to the gravity well of a photon or other lightspeed particle, although it does not take into account quantum uncertainty in particle position or momentum.

The metric tensor can be written, in terms of Brinkmann coordinates, as

$$ds^2 = -8m \, \delta(u) \, \log r \, du^2 + 2 \, du \, dv + dr^2 + r^2 \, d\theta^2,$$
$$-\infty < u,v < \infty, \, 0 < r < \infty, \, -\pi < \theta < \pi$$

The ultraboost can be obtained as the limit of a metric, which is also an exact solution, at least if one admits impulsive curvatures. For example, one can take a Gaussian pulse.

$$ds^2 = -\frac{4 m a \, \log(r)}{\pi \, (1+a^2 u^2)} \, du^2
+ 2 du \, dv + dr^2 + r^2 \, d\theta^2,$$

In these plus-polarized axisymmetric vacuum pp-waves, the curvature is concentrated along the axis of symmetry, falling off like $O(m/r)$, and also near $u=0$. As $a \rightarrow \infty$, the wave profile turns into a Dirac delta and the ultraboost is recovered.

The ultraboost helps also to understand why fast moving observers won't see moving stars and planet-like objects become black holes.
