= Belinski–Zakharov transform =

Mathematical transform to generate soliton solutions of Einstein's field equations

The Belinski–Zakharov (inverse) transform is a nonlinear transformation that generates new exact solutions of the vacuum Einstein's field equation. It was developed by Vladimir Belinski and Vladimir Zakharov in 1978. The Belinski–Zakharov transform is a generalization of the inverse scattering transform. The solutions produced by this transform are called gravitational solitons (gravisolitons). Despite the term 'soliton' being used to describe gravitational solitons, their behavior is very different from other (classical) solitons. In particular, gravitational solitons do not preserve their amplitude and shape in time, and up to June 2012 their general interpretation remains unknown. What is known however, is that most black holes (and particularly the Schwarzschild metric and the Kerr metric) are special cases of gravitational solitons.

== Introduction ==
The Belinski–Zakharov transform works for spacetime intervals of the form

$$ds^2 = f (-d(x^0)^2 + d(x^1)^2) + g_{ab} \, dx^a \, dx^b$$

where we use the Einstein summation convention for $a,b=2,3$. It is assumed that both the function $f$ and the matrix $g=g_{ab}$ depend on the coordinates $x^0$ and $x^1$ only. Despite being a specific form of the spacetime interval that depends only on two variables, it includes a great number of interesting solutions as special cases, such as the Schwarzschild metric, the Kerr metric, Einstein–Rosen metric, and many others.

In this case, Einstein's vacuum equation $R_{\mu\nu}=0$ decomposes into two sets of equations for the matrix $g=g_{ab}$ and the function $f$. Using light-cone coordinates $\zeta = x^0 + x^1,\eta = x^0 - x^1$, the first equation for the matrix $g$ is

$$(\alpha g_{,\zeta} g^{-1})_{,\eta} + (\alpha g_{,\eta} g^{-1})_{,\zeta} = 0 ,$$

where $\alpha$ is the square root of the determinant of $g$, namely

$$\det g=\alpha^2$$

The second set of equations is

$$(\ln f)_{,\zeta} = \frac{(\ln \alpha)_{,\zeta\zeta}}{(\ln \alpha)_{,\zeta}}  + \frac{\alpha}{4 \alpha_{,\zeta}} \operatorname{tr} (g_{,\zeta} g^{-1} g_{,\zeta} g^{-1})$$
$$(\ln f)_{,\eta} = \frac{(\ln \alpha)_{,\eta\eta}}{(\ln \alpha)_{,\eta}} + \frac{\alpha}{4 \alpha_{,\eta}} \operatorname{tr} (g_{,\eta} g^{-1} g_{,\eta} g^{-1})$$

Taking the trace of the matrix equation for $g$ reveals that in fact $\alpha$ satisfies the wave equation

$$\alpha_{,\zeta\eta}=0$$

== Lax pair ==
Consider the linear operators $D_1, D_2$ defined by

$$D_1 = \partial_\zeta + \frac{2\alpha_{,\zeta}\lambda}{\lambda-\alpha} \partial_\lambda$$
$$D_2 = \partial_\eta - \frac{2\alpha_{,\eta}\lambda}{\lambda+\alpha} \partial_\lambda$$

where $\lambda$ is an auxiliary complex spectral parameter. A simple computation shows that since $\alpha$ satisfies the wave equation, $\left[D_1,D_2\right]=0$. This pair of operators commute, this is the Lax pair.

The gist behind the inverse scattering transform is rewriting the nonlinear Einstein equation as an overdetermined linear system of equation for a new matrix function $\psi = \psi(\zeta,\eta,\lambda)$. Consider the Belinski–Zakharov equations:

$$D_1 \psi = \frac{A}{\lambda-\alpha} \psi$$
$$D_2 \psi = \frac{B}{\lambda+\alpha} \psi$$

By operating on the left-hand side of the first equation with $D_2$ and on the left-hand side of the second equation with $D_1$ and subtracting the results, the left-hand side vanishes as a result of the commutativity of $D_1$ and $D_2$. As for the right-hand side, a short computation shows that indeed it vanishes as well precisely when $g$ satisfies the nonlinear matrix Einstein equation.

This means that the overdetermined linear Belinski–Zakharov equations are solvable simultaneously exactly when $g$ solves the nonlinear matrix equation. One can easily restore $g$ from the matrix-valued function $\psi$ by a simple limiting process. Taking the limit $\lambda\rightarrow 0$ in the Belinski–Zakharov equations and multiplying by $\psi^{-1}$ from the right gives

$$\psi_{,\zeta} \psi^{-1} = g_{,\zeta} g^{-1}$$
$$\psi_{,\eta} \psi^{-1} = g_{,\eta} g^{-1}$$

Thus a solution of the nonlinear $g$ equation is obtained from a solution of the linear Belinski–Zakharov equation by a simple evaluation

$$g(\zeta,\eta)=\psi(\zeta,\eta,0)$$
