= Pp-wave spacetime =

Concept in general relativity

In general relativity, the pp-wave spacetimes, or pp-waves for short, are an important family of exact solutions of Einstein's field equation. The term pp stands for plane-fronted waves with parallel propagation, and was introduced in 1962 by Jürgen Ehlers and Wolfgang Kundt.

== Overview ==
The pp-waves solutions model radiation moving at the speed of light. This radiation may consist of:

- electromagnetic radiation,
- gravitational radiation,
- massless radiation associated with Weyl fermions,
- massless radiation associated with some hypothetical distinct type relativistic classical field,

or any combination of these, so long as the radiation is all moving in the same direction.

A special type of pp-wave spacetime, the plane wave spacetimes, provide the most general analogue in general relativity of the plane waves familiar to students of electromagnetism. In particular, in general relativity, we must take into account the gravitational effects of the energy density of the electromagnetic field itself. When we do this, purely electromagnetic plane waves provide the direct generalization of ordinary plane wave solutions in Maxwell's theory.

Furthermore, in general relativity, disturbances in the gravitational field itself can propagate, at the speed of light, as "wrinkles" in the curvature of spacetime. Such gravitational radiation is the gravitational field analogue of electromagnetic radiation. In general relativity, the gravitational analogue of electromagnetic plane waves are precisely the vacuum solutions among the plane wave spacetimes. They are called gravitational plane waves.

There are physically important examples of pp-wave spacetimes which are not plane wave spacetimes. In particular, the physical experience of an observer who whizzes by a gravitating object (such as a star or a black hole) at nearly the speed of light can be modelled by an impulsive pp-wave spacetime called the Aichelburg–Sexl ultraboost. The gravitational field of a beam of light is modelled, in general relativity, by a certain axi-symmetric pp-wave.

An example of pp-wave given when gravity is in presence of matter is the gravitational field surrounding a neutral Weyl fermion: the system consists in a gravitational field that is a pp-wave, no electrodynamic radiation, and a massless spinor exhibiting axial symmetry. In the Weyl-Lewis-Papapetrou spacetime, there exists a complete set of exact solutions for both gravity and matter.

Pp-waves were introduced by Hans Brinkmann in 1925 and have been rediscovered many times since, most notably by Albert Einstein and Nathan Rosen in 1937. More research is indeed on its way.

== Mathematical definition ==
A pp-wave spacetime is any Lorentzian manifold whose metric tensor can be described, with respect to Brinkmann coordinates, in the form

$$ds^2 = H(u,x,y) \, du^2 + 2 \, du \, dv + dx^2 + dy^2$$

where $H$ is any smooth function. This was the original definition of Brinkmann, and it has the virtue of being easy to understand.

The definition which is now standard in the literature is more sophisticated. It makes no reference to any coordinate chart, so it is a coordinate-free definition. It states that any Lorentzian manifold which admits a covariantly constant null vector field $k$ is called a pp-wave spacetime. That is, the covariant derivative of $k$ must vanish identically:

$$\nabla k = 0.$$

This definition was introduced by Ehlers and Kundt in 1962. To relate Brinkmann's definition to this one, take $k = \partial_v$, the coordinate vector orthogonal to the hypersurfaces $v=v_0$. In the index-gymnastics notation for tensor equations, the condition on $k$ can be written $k_{a ;b} = 0$.

Neither of these definitions make any mention of any field equation; in fact, they are entirely independent of physics. The vacuum Einstein equations are very simple for pp waves, and in fact linear: the metric $ds^2 = H(u,x,y) \, du^2 + 2 \, du \, dv + dx^2 + dy^2$ obeys these equations if and only if $H_{xx} + H_{yy} = 0$. But the definition of a pp-wave spacetime does not impose this equation, so it is entirely mathematical and belongs to the study of pseudo-Riemannian geometry. In the next section we turn to physical interpretations of pp-wave spacetimes.

Ehlers and Kundt gave several more coordinate-free characterizations, including:

- A Lorentzian manifold is a pp-wave if and only if it admits a one-parameter subgroup of isometries having null orbits, and whose curvature tensor has vanishing eigenvalues.
- A Lorentzian manifold with nonvanishing curvature is a (nontrivial) pp-wave if and only if it admits a covariantly constant bivector. (If so, this bivector is a null bivector.)

== Physical interpretation ==
It is a purely mathematical fact that the characteristic polynomial of the Einstein tensor of any pp-wave spacetime vanishes identically. Equivalently, we can find a Newman–Penrose complex null tetrad such that the Ricci-NP scalars $\Phi_{ij}$ (describing any matter or nongravitational fields which may be present in a spacetime) and the Weyl-NP scalars $\Psi_i$ (describing any gravitational field which may be present) each have only one nonvanishing component. Specifically, with respect to the NP tetrad

$$\vec{\ell} = \partial_u - H/2 \, \partial_v$$
$$\vec{n} = \partial_v$$
$$\vec{m} = \frac{1}{\sqrt2} \, \left( \partial_x + i \, \partial_y\right)$$

the only nonvanishing component of the Ricci spinor is

$$\Phi_{00} = \frac{1}{4} \, \left( H_{xx} + H_{yy} \right)$$

and the only nonvanishing component of the Weyl spinor is

$$\Psi_0 = \frac{1}{4} \, \left( \left( H_{xx}-H_{yy} \right) + 2i \, H_{xy} \right).$$

This means that any pp-wave spacetime can be interpreted, in the context of general relativity, as a null dust solution. Also, the Weyl tensor always has Petrov type N as may be verified by using the Bel criteria.

In other words, pp-waves model various kinds of classical and massless radiation traveling at the local speed of light. This radiation can be gravitational, electromagnetic, Weyl fermions, or some hypothetical kind of massless radiation other than these three, or any combination of these. All this radiation is traveling in the same direction, and the null vector $k = \partial_v$ plays the role of a wave vector.

== Relation to other classes of exact solutions ==
Unfortunately, the terminology concerning pp-waves, while fairly standard, is highly confusing and tends to promote misunderstanding.

In any pp-wave spacetime, the covariantly constant vector field $k$ always has identically vanishing optical scalars. Therefore, pp-waves belong to the Kundt class (the class of Lorentzian manifolds admitting a null congruence with vanishing optical scalars).

Going in the other direction, pp-waves include several important special cases.

From the form of Ricci spinor given in the preceding section, it is immediately apparent that a pp-wave spacetime (written in the Brinkmann chart) is a vacuum solution if and only if $H$ is a harmonic function (with respect to the spatial coordinates $x,y$). Physically, these represent purely gravitational radiation propagating along the null rays $\partial_v$.

Ehlers and Kundt and Sippel and Gönner have classified vacuum pp-wave spacetimes by their autometry group, or group of self-isometries. This is always a Lie group, and as usual it is easier to classify the underlying Lie algebras of Killing vector fields. It turns out that the most general pp-wave spacetime has only one Killing vector field, the null geodesic congruence $k=\partial_v$. However, for various special forms of $H$, there are additional Killing vector fields.

The most important class of particularly symmetric pp-waves are the plane wave spacetimes, which were first studied by Baldwin and Jeffery. A plane wave is a pp-wave in which $H$ is quadratic, and can hence be transformed to the simple form

$$H(u,x,y)=a(u) \, (x^2-y^2) + 2 \, b(u) \, xy + c(u) \, (x^2+y^2)$$

Here, $a,b,c$ are arbitrary smooth functions of $u$. Physically speaking, $a,b$ describe the wave profiles of the two linearly independent polarization modes of gravitational radiation which may be present, while $c$ describes the wave profile of any nongravitational radiation. If $c = 0$, we have the vacuum plane waves, which are often called plane gravitational waves.

Equivalently, a plane-wave is a pp-wave with at least a five-dimensional Lie algebra of Killing vector fields $X$, including $X = \partial_v$ and four more which have the form

$$X = \frac{\partial}{\partial u}(p x + q y) \, \partial_v
+ p \, \partial_x + q \, \partial_y$$

where

$$\ddot{p} = -a p + b q - c p$$
$$\ddot{q} = a q - b p - c q.$$

Intuitively, the distinction is that the wavefronts of plane waves are truly planar; all points on a given two-dimensional wavefront are equivalent. This not quite true for more general pp-waves. Plane waves are important for many reasons; to mention just one, they are essential for the beautiful topic of colliding plane waves.

A more general subclass consists of the axisymmetric pp-waves, which in general have a two-dimensional Abelian Lie algebra of Killing vector fields. These are also called SG2 plane waves, because they are the second type in the symmetry classification of Sippel and Gönner. A limiting case of certain axisymmetric pp-waves yields the Aichelburg/Sexl ultraboost modeling an ultrarelativistic encounter with an isolated spherically symmetric object.

(See also the article on plane wave spacetimes for a discussion of physically important special cases of plane waves.)

J. D. Steele has introduced the notion of generalised pp-wave spacetimes. These are nonflat Lorentzian spacetimes which admit a self-dual covariantly constant null bivector field. The name is potentially misleading, since as Steele points out, these are nominally a special case of nonflat pp-waves in the sense defined above. They are only a generalization in the sense that although the Brinkmann metric form is preserved, they are not necessarily the vacuum solutions studied by Ehlers and Kundt, Sippel and Gönner, etc.

Another important special class of pp-waves are the sandwich waves. These have vanishing curvature except on some range $u_1 < u < u_2$, and represent a gravitational wave moving through a Minkowski spacetime background.

== Relation to other theories ==
Since they constitute a very simple and natural class of Lorentzian manifolds, defined in terms of a null congruence, it is not very surprising that they are also important in other relativistic classical field theories of gravitation. In particular, pp-waves are exact solutions in the Brans–Dicke theory, various higher curvature theories and Kaluza–Klein theories, and certain gravitation theories of J. W. Moffat. Indeed, B. O. J. Tupper has shown that the common vacuum solutions in general relativity and in the Brans/Dicke theory are precisely the vacuum pp-waves (but the Brans/Dicke theory admits further wavelike solutions). Hans-Jürgen Schmidt has reformulated the theory of (four-dimensional) pp-waves in terms of a two-dimensional metric-dilaton theory of gravity.

Pp-waves also play an important role in the search for quantum gravity, because as Gary Gibbons has pointed out, all loop term quantum corrections vanish identically for any pp-wave spacetime. This means that studying tree-level quantizations of pp-wave spacetimes offers a glimpse into the yet unknown world of quantum gravity.

It is natural to generalize pp-waves to higher dimensions, where they enjoy similar properties to those we have discussed. C. M. Hull has shown that such higher-dimensional pp-waves are essential building blocks for eleven-dimensional supergravity.

== Geometric and physical properties ==
PP-waves enjoy numerous striking properties. Some of their more abstract mathematical properties have already been mentioned. In this section a few additional properties are presented.

Consider an inertial observer in Minkowski spacetime who encounters a sandwich plane wave. Such an observer will experience some interesting optical effects. If he looks into the oncoming wavefronts at distant galaxies which have already encountered the wave, he will see their images undistorted. This must be the case, since he cannot know the wave is coming until it reaches his location, for it is traveling at the speed of light. However, this can be confirmed by direct computation of the optical scalars of the null congruence $\partial_v$. Now suppose that after the wave passes, our observer turns about face and looks through the departing wavefronts at distant galaxies which the wave has not yet reached. Now he sees their optical images sheared and magnified (or demagnified) in a time-dependent manner. If the wave happens to be a polarized gravitational plane wave, he will see circular images alternately squeezed horizontally while expanded vertically, and squeezed vertically while expanded horizontally. This directly exhibits the characteristic effect of a gravitational wave in general relativity on light.

The effect of a passing polarized gravitational plane wave on the relative positions of a cloud of (initially static) test particles will be qualitatively very similar. We might mention here that in general, the motion of test particles in pp-wave spacetimes can exhibit chaos.

The fact that Einstein's field equation is nonlinear is well known. This implies that if you have two exact solutions, there is almost never any way to linearly superimpose them. PP waves provide a rare exception to this rule: if you have two PP waves sharing the same covariantly constant null vector (the same geodesic null congruence, i.e. the same wave vector field), with metric functions $H_1, H_2$ respectively, then $H_1 + H_2$ gives a third exact solution.

Roger Penrose has observed that near a null geodesic, every Lorentzian spacetime looks like a plane wave. To show this, he used techniques imported from algebraic geometry to "blow up" the spacetime so that the given null geodesic becomes the covariantly constant null geodesic congruence of a plane wave. This construction is called a Penrose limit.

Penrose also pointed out that in a pp-wave spacetime, all the polynomial scalar invariants of the Riemann tensor vanish identically, yet the curvature is almost never zero. This is because in four-dimension all pp-waves belong to the class of VSI spacetimes. Such statement does not hold in higher-dimensions since there are higher-dimensional pp-waves of algebraic type II with non-vanishing polynomial scalar invariants. If you view the Riemann tensor as a second rank tensor acting on bivectors, the vanishing of invariants is analogous to the fact that a nonzero null vector has vanishing squared length.

Penrose was also the first to understand the strange nature of causality in pp-sandwich wave spacetimes. He showed that some or all of the null geodesics emitted at a given event will be refocused at a later event (or string of events). The details depend upon whether the wave is purely gravitational, purely electromagnetic, or neither.

Every pp-wave admits many different Brinkmann charts. These are related by coordinate transformations, which in this context may be considered to be gauge transformations. In the case of plane waves, these gauge transformations allow us to always regard two colliding plane waves to have parallel wavefronts, and thus the waves can be said to collide head-on. This is an exact result in fully nonlinear general relativity which is analogous to a similar result concerning electromagnetic plane waves as treated in special relativity.

== Examples ==
There are many noteworthy explicit examples of pp-waves. ("Explicit" means that the metric functions can be written down in terms of elementary functions or perhaps well-known special functions such as Mathieu functions.)

Explicit examples of axisymmetric pp-waves include

- The Aichelburg–Sexl ultraboost is an impulsive plane wave which models the physical experience of an observer who whizzes by a spherically symmetric gravitating object at nearly the speed of light,
- The Bonnor beam is an axisymmetric plane wave which models the gravitational field of an infinitely long beam of incoherent electromagnetic radiation.

Explicit examples of plane wave spacetimes include

- exact monochromatic gravitational plane wave and monochromatic electromagnetic plane wave solutions, which generalize solutions which are well-known from weak-field approximation,
- exact solutions of the gravitational field of a Weyl fermion,
- the Schwarzschild generating plane wave, a gravitational plane wave which, should it collide head-on with a twin, will produce in the interaction zone of the resulting colliding plane wave solution a region which is locally isometric to part of the interior of a Schwarzschild black hole, thereby permitting a classical peek at the local geometry inside the event horizon,
- the uniform electromagnetic plane wave; this spacetime is foliated by spacelike hyperslices which are isometric to $S^3$,
- the wave of death is a gravitational plane wave exhibiting a strong nonscalar null curvature singularity, which propagates through an initially flat spacetime, progressively destroying the universe,
- homogeneous plane waves, or SG11 plane waves (type 11 in the Sippel and Gönner symmetry classification), which exhibit a weak nonscalar null curvature singularity and which arise as the Penrose limits of an appropriate null geodesic approaching the curvature singularity which is present in many physically important solutions, including the Schwarzschild black holes and FRW cosmological models.

== See also ==
- Gravitational wave
- Newman–Penrose formalism
