= Gravitational Aharonov-Bohm effect =

Physical phenomenon

In physics, the gravitational Aharonov-Bohm effect is a phenomenon involving the behavior of particles acting according to quantum mechanics while under the influence of a classical gravitational field. It is the gravitational analog of the well-known Aharonov–Bohm effect, which is about the quantum mechanical behavior of particles in a classical electromagnetic field.

== Electric effect ==
There are many variants of the Aharonov-Bohm effect in electromagnetism. Here we review an electric version of the Aharonov-Bohm effect that is most similar to the gravitational effect which has been experimentally observed. This electric effect is caused by a charged particle (say, an electron) being in a superposition of traveling down two different paths. In both paths, the electric field that the electron sees is zero everywhere along the path, but the scalar electric potential that the electron sees is not the same for both paths.

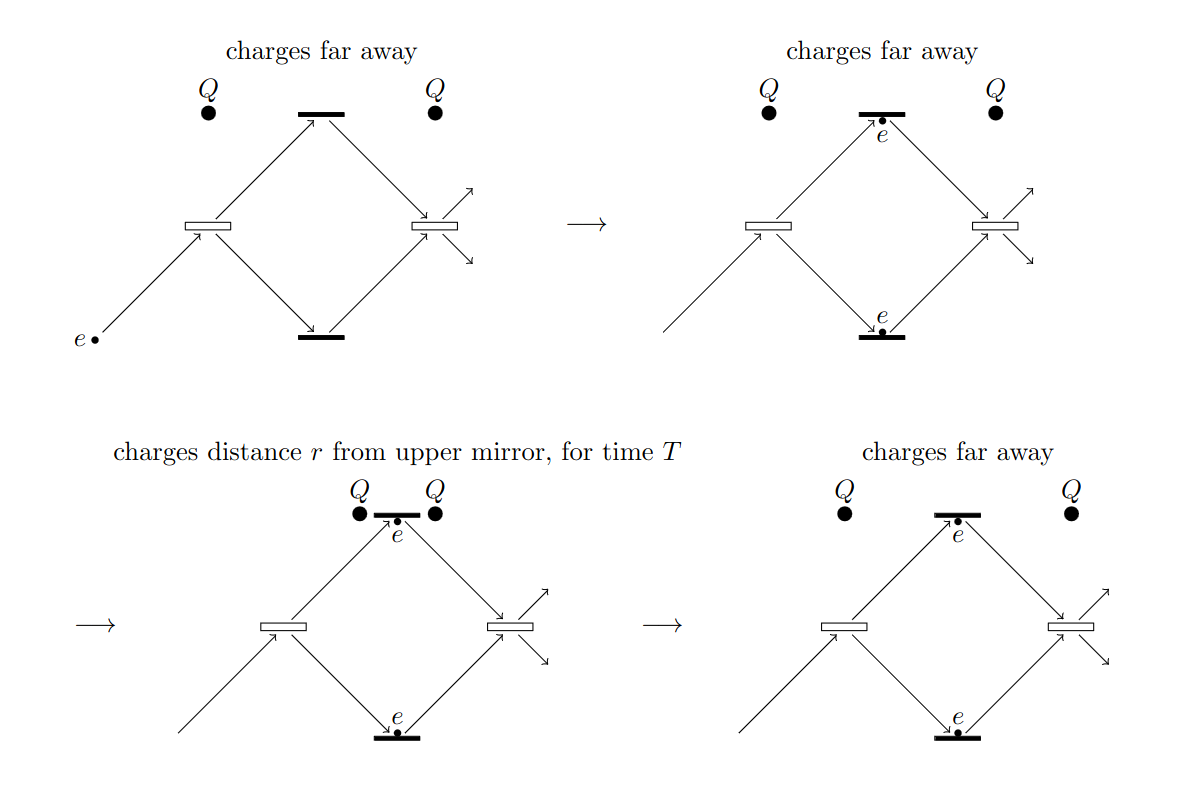

In the above figure, the beamsplitter puts the electron in a superposition of taking the upper path and taking the lower path. In both paths, when the electron gets to the mirror, it is stopped and held there. During that time when the electron is held in place at a mirror, 2 electric charges each with charge $Q$ are brought near the upper mirror in a symmetric manner such that the net electric field caused by the 2 charges at the upper mirror is 0. We assume that the lower mirror is far enough away from the upper mirror such that the electric potential (and electric field) caused by the 2 charges is 0 at the lower mirror. So, this creates an electric potential difference between upper and lower mirrors equal to $\Delta U=\frac{2Q}{4\pi\epsilon_0r}$, where $r$ is the distance of the charges from the mirror and $\epsilon_0$ is the electric constant. The electron is held there for a time $T$, after which the charges are moved away and the electron is allowed to continue moving along its path. Assuming that the time we take to move the 2 charges to and from the mirror is much smaller than $T$, this time that the electron spends at the mirror causes a phase shift equal to

$\Delta\phi=-e\Delta UT/\hbar=-\frac{2eQT}{4\pi\epsilon_0r\hbar}$

where $e$ is the elementary charge.

When the 2 paths of the interferometer are recombined, we see a different interference pattern depending on whether we brought the charges near the upper mirror to create a potential difference. This is surprising, because no matter whether we brought the charges near the upper mirror to create a potential difference, the electron always remains at a location where the electric field is zero (to be more precise, the wavefunction of the electron is only ever nonzero at locations where the electric field is 0).

This electric Aharonov-Bohm effect has not been experimentally observed, unlike the magnetic effect. It not generally feasible to trap an electron at a "mirror" in the interferometer while the potential is turned on and off, which is necessary in this setup to ensure that the electron stays in a region where the field is 0 while the potential is varied. Proposals for experimentally observing the effect instead involve shielding the electron from any electric field by having it travel through a conducting cylinder while the potential is varied. In contrast, one experiment proposal for the gravitational Aharonov-Bohm effect actually does involve trapping atoms (which play an analogous role to electrons in the experiment proposal) and holding them in a region where the gravitation field is zero using optical lattices.

== Gravitational effect ==
Just as there are many variants of the Aharonov-Bohm effect in electromagnetism, there are many variants of the gravitational effect. The simplest version of the gravitational effect is analogous to the electric effect above, with the electron replaced by a small test mass such as an atom, and the 2 charges that create an electric potential replaced by 2 masses that create a gravitational potential.

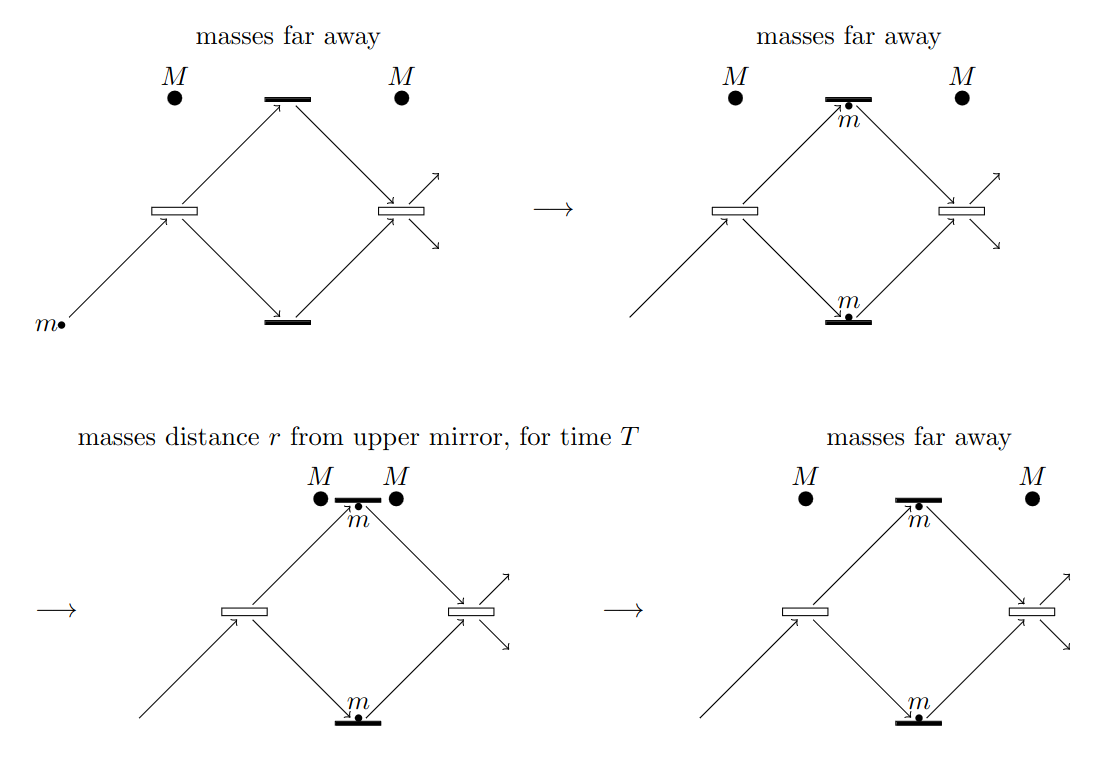

In the above figure, an atom passes through an atomic "beamsplitter" that puts the atom in a superposition of taking the upper and lower paths. The atoms are then reflected by atomic "mirrors" that cause them to recombine at the detector on the right, where an interference pattern is detected.

When the atom is at a "mirror", it is paused and held there while a potential is introduced. The potential is created by moving 2 massive objects, each with mass $M$, to the left and right sides of the upper mirror, a distance $r$ away from the mirror. The masses are brought towards the upper mirror in a symmetric manner such that the gravitational field caused by the masses is 0 at the upper mirror. We assume that the upper mirror is far enough away from the lower mirror such that the masses create zero potential (and zero field) at the lower mirror, which means they create a gravitational potential difference of $\Delta U=-\frac{2GM}{r}$ between the upper and lower mirrors. Despite this gravitational potential difference, the gravitational field at the upper and lower mirrors is 0, and the atom is never in any position with a nonzero gravitation field. Still, a time $T$ spent at the mirrors with that potential difference causes a phase shift,

$\Delta\phi=\Delta UmT/\hbar=-\frac{2GMmT}{r\hbar}$

where $m$ is the mass of the atom. This phase shift is detected by observing the interference pattern where the atom paths recombine, which will be different depending on whether the potential difference was applied.

Instead of these idealized paths for the atom that involve "mirrors" that pause the atom in its place while a potential is applied, the atom could be moved in those paths by an optical lattice. This would allow precise control over the positions of the atom and the amount of time spent in the gravitational potential.

The various electromagnetic versions of the Aharonv-Bohm effect can be described in a way that does not suggest any physical reality to the electromagnetic potentials and does not require any nonlocality, by treating the sources of the electromagnetic field and the electromagnetic field itself quantum mechanically, instead of treating the test charge (electron) quantum mechanically and the electromagnetic field and its sources classically. Without a theory of quantum gravity, we cannot appeal to a fully quantum treatment of the test mass (atom), the sources of the gravitational field, and the gravitational field itself in order to explain the gravitational Aharonov-Bohm effect in a fully local, gauge-independent manner. However, this effect can be explained in a local, gauge-independent manner by considering the gravitational time dilation experienced by the atom in the path with the nonzero potential, and taking into account that matter waves pick up a phase at the Compton frequency of the matter.

== Experimental observation ==
In January 2022, a team led by Mark Kasevich announced that they had experimentally observed a gravitational Aharonov-Bohm effect with an experiment broadly similar to the one outlined above.

The source of the gravitational potential in their experiment was a single 1.25 kg tungsten mass. The test masses were rubidium-87 atoms. The tungsten mass was fixed, so the gravitational field caused by the tungsten mass was not zero everywhere along the paths of the ^{87}Rb atoms. This means that the phase shift of the rubidium atoms between the 2 paths was not caused by a gravitational potential energy difference alone, but also by a difference in the gravitational force felt by the atoms in the 2 paths. By detecting a difference in the phase shift between when the tungsten mass is present and when it is not present, they observed a phase shift consistent with that predicted by the Aharonov-Bohm effect.

The "beamsplitters" and "mirrors" used to make the ^{87}Rb atoms interfere are not solid-state components as would be the case with standard interferometers with light. Rather, they consisted of laser pulses that coherently transfer momentum between the atoms and photons.
