= Peter C. Aichelburg =

Austrian physicist

- Born: 9 November 1941 (age 84); Vienna, Greater German Reich (present-day Austria)
- Citizenship: Austria
- Education: University of Vienna
- Known for: contributions to general relativity
- Scientific career
- Fields: Theoretical physics
- Workplaces: University of Vienna, International Centre for Theoretical Physics, Universidad Simón Bolívar, University of the Andes, Colombia, University of Texas at Austin, Universidad Autónoma Metropolitana, Isaac Newton Institute, University of California, Santa Barbara
- Thesis: [1967 „Das Anfangswertproblem eines harmonischen Oszillators im Strahlungsfeld"]
- Doctoral advisor: Walter Thirring

Peter C. Aichelburg (born 9 November 1941) is an Austrian physicist known for his contributions to general relativity, particularly for his joint work with Roman Sexl on the Aichelburg–Sexl ultraboost of the Schwarzschild vacuum.

== Life ==
Peter Aichelburg is the second child of Ludwig Aichelburg (born 1917) and Martha Michalek (born 1920), a descendant of the Bohemian line of the House of Aichelburg from Carinthia.

Lectures by Walter Thirring influenced him to pursue theoretical problems. He had a scholarship at the International Centre for Theoretical Physics (ICTP), Trieste, Italy from 1968 to 1969.

Before his retirement in November 2007 Aichelburg taught at the University of Vienna, where he held a position of full professor ( Univ.-Prof. Dr. ) at the Institute of Theoretical Physics.

== Personal ==
Peter Aichelburg has a wife and a son.

== Books ==
- Peter C. Aichelburg; Roman U. Sexl, eds. (1979). Albert Einstein: his influence on physics, philosophy and politics. Braunschweig; Wiesbaden: Springer. ISBN 3-528-08425-1.
