= Quadrupole formula =

Formula in general relativity

In general relativity, the quadrupole formula describes the gravitational waves that are emitted from a system of masses in terms of the (mass) quadrupole moment. The formula reads:

$$\bar{h}_{ij}(t,r) = \frac{2 G}{c^4 r} \ddot{I}_{ij} (t-r/c),$$

where $\bar{h}_{ij}$ is the spatial part of the trace reversed perturbation of the metric, i.e. the gravitational wave. $G$ is the gravitational constant, $c$ the speed of light in vacuum, and $I_{ij}$ is the mass quadrupole moment.

It is useful to express the gravitational wave strain in the transverse traceless gauge, by replacing the mass quadrupole moment $I_{ij}$ with the transverse traceless projection $I_{ij}^{TT}$, which is defined as:
$${I}_{ij}^{TT} = \int \rho(\mathbf{r}) \left[r_i r_j - r_n \left(r_i n_j + r_j n_i\right) + \tfrac{1}{2} r_n^2 \left(n_i n_j + \delta_{ij} \right) + \tfrac{1}{2} r^2 \left(n_i n_j - \delta_{ij} \right) \right]  d^3 r$$
where $\mathbf{n}$ is a unit vector in the direction of the observer, $r_n \equiv \mathbf{r}\cdot\mathbf{n}$, and $r^2 \equiv \mathbf{r}\cdot\mathbf{r}$.

The total energy carried away by gravitational waves can be expressed as:
$$\frac{d E}{dt} = \sum_{ij} \frac{G}{5 c^5} \left( \frac{d^3 I_{ij}^{T}}{dt^3} \right)^2$$
where $I_{ij}^{T}$ is the traceless mass quadrupole moment, which is given by:
$${I}_{ij}^T = \int \rho(\mathbf{x}) \left[r_i r_j - \tfrac{1}{3} r^2 \delta_{ij}\right]  d^3 r.$$

The formula was first obtained by Albert Einstein in 1918. After a long history of debate on its physical correctness, observations of energy loss due to gravitational radiation in the Hulse–Taylor binary discovered in 1974 confirmed the result, with agreement up to 0.2 percent (by 2005).

== See also ==
- Multipole radiation
- Birkhoff's theorem (relativity)
- PSR J0737−3039
