= Roman Ulrich Sexl =

Austrian physicist (1939–1986)

- Born: 19 October 1939; Vienna, Austria
- Died: 10 July 1986 (aged 46); Vienna, Austria
- Education: University of Vienna
- Known for: contributions to general relativity, textbooks on Special relativity
- Awards: Richard Wohl price
- Scientific career
- Fields: Theoretical physics
- Workplaces: University of Vienna, Miami University
- Doctoral students: Reza Mansouri

Roman Ulrich Sexl (19 October 1939 – 10 July 1986) was one of the leading Austrian theoretical physicists. He is famous for his textbooks on special relativity.

== Life ==
His most cited work is "On the gravitational field of a massless particle" together with Peter C. Aichelburg. Since 1972 he was professor for Cosmology and General Relativity at the University of Vienna, where, from 1969, he was director of the Institute of Theoretical Physics. From 1971 to 1975 he was the director of the Institute for Space Exploration at the Austrian Academy of Sciences.

In 1980 he received the Robert Wichard-Pohl prize. Today there is the annual Roman-Ulrich-Sexl-Prize for extraordinary achievements in teaching physics.

== Publications ==
- Relativity (1972)
- Gravitation and Cosmology (1975)
- Relativity, Groups and Particles (1975)
- Aichelburg, Peter C.; Sexl, Roman U. (1979). Albert Einstein: his influence on physics, philosophy and politics. Braunschweig; Wiesbaden. ISBN 3-528-08425-1.
