= Bonnor beam =

Exact solution in general relativity

In general relativity, the Bonnor beam is an exact solution which models an infinitely long, straight beam of light. It is an explicit example of a pp-wave spacetime. It is named after William B. Bonnor who first described it.

The Bonnor beam is obtained by matching together two regions:

- a uniform plane wave interior region, which is shaped like the world tube of a solid cylinder, and models the electromagnetic and gravitational fields inside the beam,
- a vacuum exterior region, which models the gravitational field outside the beam.

On the "cylinder" where they meet, the two regions are required to obey matching conditions stating that the metric tensor and extrinsic curvature tensor must agree.

The interior part of the solution is defined by

$$\left\{
\begin{array}{lr}
ds^2 =
-8 \pi m r^2 \, du^2 - 2 \, du \, dv + dr^2 + r^2 \, d\theta^2,\\-\infty < u,\\
v < \infty,\\
0 < r < r_0,\\
-\pi < \theta < \pi.\\
\end{array}
\right.$$

This is a null dust solution and can be interpreted as incoherent electromagnetic radiation.

The exterior part of the solution is defined by

$$\left\{
\begin{array}{lr}
ds^2 = -8 \pi m r_0^2 \left( 1 + 2 \log(r/r_0) \right) \, du^2
- 2 \, du \, dv + dr^2 + r^2 \, d\theta^2 \\
-\infty < u,\\
v < \infty,\\
r_0 < r < \infty,\\
-\pi < \theta < \pi.\\
\end{array}
\right.$$

The Bonnor beam can be generalized to several parallel beams travelling in the same direction. Perhaps surprisingly, the beams do not curve toward one another. On the other hand, "anti-parallel" beams (travelling along parallel trajectories, but in opposite directions) do attract each other. This reflects a general phenomenon: two pp-waves with parallel wave vectors superimpose linearly, but pp-waves with nonparallel wave vectors (including antiparallel Bonnor beams) do not superimpose linearly, as we would expect from the nonlinear nature of the Einstein field equation.
