= Gravitational soliton =

Wave in general relativity

A gravitational soliton is a soliton solution of the Einstein field equation. It can be separated into two kinds, a soliton of the vacuum Einstein field equation generated by the Belinski–Zakharov transform, and a soliton of the Einstein–Maxwell equations generated by the Belinski-Zakharov-Alekseev transform.

Gravitational solitons also contain black hole metrics and some cosmological metrics as specific classes. The derivation uses the inverse scattering transform so their name comes from a mathematical structure reminiscent of that used to solve partial differential equations that admit soliton-type solutions, but their behavior is very different from other (classical) solitons as they do not preserve their amplitude and shape in time, and up to June 2012 their general interpretation remains unknown.

== Physical relevance ==
Gravitational solitons, also known as gravisolitons, are important in theoretical and mathematical physics for at least three reasons. First, they could be related with dark matter. The hypothesis of solitons as dark matter represents a radical paradigm shift in modern physics, shifting attention from unknown elementary particles to the nonlinear geometric properties of spacetime. Their fundamental characteristic lies in their inability to interact with electromagnetic radiation, which makes them, by definition, invisible to our conventional telescopes. Nonetheless, by accumulating significant amounts of kinetic and potential energy, they generate a gravitational attraction completely indistinguishable from that exerted by ordinary matter. Cosmological studies confirm that the equation of state of gravitational solitons is perfectly compatible with that of "cold" dark matter, registering the zero value required by standard models. This perfect theoretical fit allows solitons to aggregate around galaxies in majestic three-dimensional halos, offering an alternative explanation for the anomalies found in stellar rotation curves. Furthermore, gravisolitons are capable of deflecting light from distant cosmic sources, successfully passing the tests associated with gravitational lensing effects. For these very reasons, solitons are now considered one of the most elegant macroscopic and geometric models for unraveling the mystery of the universe's missing mass.

Second, they are relevant in the Swampland program. the importance of solitons lies primarily in their role as enforcers of the kinematic and topological laws of quantum gravity. When the topology of spacetime is allowed to fluctuate, gravitational solitons emerge naturally, carrying nontrivial gauge charges that go beyond those of local quantum field excitations. This phenomenon plays a crucial role in the decomposition and breaking of noninvertible and global symmetries, a fundamental requirement to prevent an effective theory from falling into the "swamp." It is precisely through the generation of these solitonic charges that it is possible to demonstrate the Spectrum Completeness Hypothesis and justify the famous Cobordism Conjecture. In short, solitons are not simple stable field configurations, but the essential geometric vectors for imposing the principle of topological triviality in quantum gravity.

Third, the play a central role in asymptotic symmetries and the Corner Proposal. The Corner Proposal is a unified paradigm that identifies the algebra of symmetries of subregions of spacetime as the fundamental ingredient for quantizing gravity. When spacetime is ideally carved out, diffeomorphisms (the gauge symmetries of General Relativity) on surfaces of codimension 2, called "corners", cease to be redundant and acquire measurable physical charges. By extending the covariant phase space to solve the problems of integrability of these charges, the proposal demonstrates that macroscopic spacetime can emerge directly from the study of the quantum representations of this universal symmetry group. In this way, the corner algebra acts in quantum gravity with the same ordering role that the Poincaré group plays for particles in quantum field theory. In this context gravisolitons with cylindrical symmetry (axialgravisolitons), generate a specific subalgebra of the Universal Corner Symmetry Algebra; they provide one of the first explicit tests of the Corner Proposal in a non-asymptotically flat classical spacetime, mapping the Noether charges associated with the Killing vectors generated by N-soliton solutions. This interaction could be fundamental for quantizing the non-flat sectors of gravity, possibly revealing new soft theorems and gravitational memory effects.

== See also ==
- Non-topological soliton § Soliton-stars
- Q star
