= William B. Bonnor =

English mathematician and physicist

- Born: 13 September 1920; London, England, UK
- Died: 17 August 2015 (aged 94)
- Occupations: mathematician, physicist
- Known for: Bonnor beam

William Bowen Bonnor (9 September 1920 – 17 August 2015) was an English mathematician and gravitation physicist best known for his research into astrophysics, cosmology and general relativity. For most of his academic career, he was a professor of mathematics at the University of London.

William Bonnor was born in London on 13 September 1920. He was educated at County High School, Ilford, at South East Essex Technical College and at Birkbeck College. His degrees of B.Sc., Ph.D. and D.Sc. were all obtained by part-time study.

On leaving school in 1937, Bonnor served in clerical and executive branches of the Civil Service until 1944, when he became a chemist in the Admiralty, doing development work in paint technology. In 1946, he joined Shell Refining and Marketing Company to work on the rheology of lubricating greases.

His career as a mathematician commenced in 1949 after obtaining a degree in mathematics at Birkbeck College. He joined the Department of Applied Mathematics at the University of Liverpool, where he met his future wife, Jean Stott, a staff tutor in social science. In 1957, he was appointed Reader and head of the mathematics department at Queen Elizabeth College (QEC), University of London. He was promoted to Professor in 1962, and stayed with the College until retirement in 1985.

This period was the golden age of general relativity, and Bonnor played a part in it, particularly in the London Relativity Seminar. This had begun at Imperial College in the 1950s, moved to King's College and then to QEC from 1977 to 1983. He was also active internationally, making contact with scientific workers in the socialist countries in eastern Europe, particularly those in Jena in East Germany. During this period he published a paper on the Bonnor Beam which models the gravitational field of a beam of light.

Bonnor held visiting appointments at the Universities of Illinois (1960–61), Otago (1984) and Cape Town (1984–86). In 1999 he was awarded the honorary degree of D.Sc. by the University of Portsmouth.

Bonnor's research was published in about 150 papers in various scientific journals. The most cited paper described the effect of gravitation on Boyle's law; this has been extensively used in the theory of star formation. Another well-cited paper applies Newtonian dynamics to the formation of galaxies in cosmology. However, most of Bonnor's research was on the theory of general relativity. In this area he worked on the theory of gravitational waves, on the field of two charged bodies, and on the interaction of spinning particles. In 1964 he published "The Mystery of the Expanding Universe", a popular book on cosmology. Bonnor remained scientifically active long after his retirement, averaging around two papers a year in his last 30 years, and had a paper under review at the time of his death. In 1999, at the age of 78, he showed that in some cosmological models the expansion of space-time affects the size of hydrogen atoms, while in others it remains strictly constant. He was also the first to write down the Melvin metric.

== Personal life ==
He married Jean Stott, and had two children. He had four grandchildren.

William Bonnor died at his home of a heart attack on 17 August 2015.
