= Brinkmann coordinates =

Coordinate system

Brinkmann coordinates are a particular coordinate system for a spacetime belonging to the family of pp-wave metrics. They are named for Hans Brinkmann. In terms of these coordinates, the metric tensor can be written as

$$ds^2 = H(u,x,y) du^2 + 2 du dv + dx^2 + dy^2$$.

Note that $\partial_{v}$, the coordinate vector field dual to the covector field $dv$, is a null vector field. Indeed, geometrically speaking, it is a null geodesic congruence with vanishing optical scalars. Physically speaking, it serves as the wave vector defining the direction of propagation for the pp-wave.

The coordinate vector field $\partial_{u}$ can be spacelike, null, or timelike at a given event in the spacetime, depending upon the sign of $H(u,x,y)$ at that event. The coordinate vector fields $\partial_{x}, \partial_{y}$ are both spacelike vector fields. Each surface $u=u_{0}, v=v_{0}$ can be thought of as a wavefront.

In discussions of exact solutions to the Einstein field equation, many authors fail to specify the intended range of the coordinate variables $u,v,x,y$. Here we should take

$-\infty < v,x,y < \infty, u_{0} < u < u_{1}$

to allow for the possibility that the pp-wave develops a null curvature singularity.
