= Nathan Rosen =

Israeli-American physicist (1909–1995)

- נתן רוזן
- Born: March 22, 1909; Brooklyn, New York, U.S.
- Died: December 18, 1995 (age 86); Haifa, Israel
- Citizenship: Israel; United States
- Education: Massachusetts Institute of Technology
- Known for: EPR paradox Einstein–Rosen bridge Einstein–Rosen metric Rosen–Morse potential Bimetric gravity Sticky bead argument
- Scientific career
- Fields: Physics
- Workplaces: Institute for Advanced Study; University of North Carolina, Chapel Hill; Technion – Israel Institute of Technology; Ben Gurion University
- Thesis: Calculation of energies of diatomic molecules
- Doctoral advisor: John Clarke Slater
- Other academic advisors: Albert Einstein
- Doctoral students: Moshe Carmeli; Asher Peres; Joshua Zak

Nathan Rosen (Hebrew: נתן רוזן; March 22, 1909 – December 18, 1995) was an American and Israeli physicist noted for his study on the structure of the hydrogen molecule and his collaboration with Albert Einstein and Boris Podolsky on entangled wave functions and the EPR paradox. He is also remembered for the Einstein–Rosen bridge, the first known kind of wormhole.

== Background ==
Nathan Rosen was born into a Jewish family in Brooklyn, New York. He attended MIT during the Great Depression, where he received a bachelor's degree in electromechanical engineering and later a master's and a doctorate in physics. As a student he published several papers of note, one being "The Neutron", which attempted to explain the structure of the atomic nucleus a year before their discovery by James Chadwick. He also developed an interest in wave functions and, later, gravitation, when he worked as a fellow at the University of Michigan and Princeton University.

== State of science ==
At the beginning of the 20th century, science was progressing quickly, and the inner workings of the atom were just beginning to be discovered. In 1900, Max Planck proposed the quantum theory, the idea that all energy moves in discrete amounts called quanta. In 1905, Albert Einstein published his theory of special relativity, which would be instrumental in the progression of physics and the understanding of the universe. Around 1927, Niels Bohr and Werner Heisenberg, collaborating with many other physicists, developed the Copenhagen interpretation of quantum theory, determining the probabilities of the movement of particles. These breakthroughs provided the model for the structure and workings of the atom and drove the revolution that would sweep up Nathan Rosen.

== Work with Einstein ==
In 1932 with a ScD degree from MIT, he went to do research at Princeton University. In 1934 he became Albert Einstein's assistant at The Institute for Advanced Study in Princeton, New Jersey, and continued in that position until 1936. In July 1935, Einstein and Rosen published an article developing a concept of folded spacetime in parallel layers connected by a bridge, using only general relativity and Maxwell's equations. Earlier, while working with Einstein, Rosen had pointed out the peculiarities of Einstein's studies involving entangled wave functions, and, in coordination with Boris Podolsky, a paper was drafted and published in May 1935 helping to develop a theoretical basis for the July 1935 publication. The May 1935 paper, entitled "Can quantum-mechanical description of physical reality be considered complete?" labeled these effects the Einstein–Podolsky–Rosen paradox, or EPR paradox. Einstein helped Rosen to continue his career in physics with a letter to Molotov in the Soviet Union, resulting in a temporary position, during which, in 1937, Einstein and Rosen published an article "On Gravitational Waves", in which they further developed the concept of folded spacetime caused by rotating cylinders.

After leaving Princeton, Rosen continued to publish on relativity with "General Relativity and Flat Space" in 1940 and "Energy and momentum of cylindrical gravitational waves" in 1958, further developing work on theoretical structures of spacetime. This concept, known today as an Einstein–Rosen bridges, was shown in a 1962 paper by theoretical physicists John A. Wheeler and Robert W. Fuller to be unstable. Other researchers further developed this work: "Robert Hjellming in 1971 presented a model in which a black hole would draw matter in while being connected to a white hole in a distant location, which expels this same matter." "In a 1988 paper, physicists Kip Thorne and Mike Morris proposed that such a wormhole could be made stable by containing some form of negative matter or energy." This later work is not attributable to Rosen.

Between 1940 and 1989, Rosen published a series of articles on his versions of bimetric gravity, an attempt to improve on general relativity by removing singularities and replacing pseudotensors with tensors to eliminate nonlocality. The effort eventually failed in 1992 with conflicting pulsar data.

== Later years ==
Later in his life, Nathan Rosen turned his attentions to teaching and the establishment of new universities. After briefly working for two years in the Soviet Union at the University of Kiev starting in 1936, he returned to the United States, where he taught at the University of North Carolina at Chapel Hill from 1941 to 1952. In 1953, after permanently moving to Israel, he joined the Technion in Haifa. During this time, Rosen was advisor to Asher Peres. Technion now has a lecture series named for him. He was President of the Ben-Gurion University of the Negev in the 1970s and commuted between the two institutions from his home in Haifa. Additionally, Nathan Rosen helped found the Israel Academy of Sciences and Humanities, the Physical Society of Israel (serving as president from 1955 to 1957), and the International Society on General Relativity and Gravitation (president 1974–1977). He was very active in encouraging the founding of higher educational institutions in Israel.

He died on December 18, 1995, at his home in Haifa at the age of 86.

== Contributions to physics ==
Rosen made a number of contributions to modern physics. One of the most lasting discoveries Rosen brought to physics was his formulation of the structure of the hydrogen molecule, a molecule where neither of the electrons have a definite quantum number, but the pair of electrons has a pure state. Rosen used what he called "entangled" wave functions to represent the molecule's structure.

He also developed a theoretical analysis of the neutron as a combination of proton and electron in a 1931 article in Physical Review.

== Selected publications ==
- Einstein, A; B Podolsky; N Rosen (1935-05-15). "Can Quantum-Mechanical Description of Physical Reality be Considered Complete?" (PDF). Physical Review. 47 (10): 777–780. Bibcode:1935PhRv...47..777E. doi:10.1103/PhysRev.47.777.
- Einstein, Albert & Rosen, Nathan (1935). "The Particle Problem in the General Theory of Relativity". Physical Review. 48 (1): 73. Bibcode:1935PhRv...48...73E. doi:10.1103/PhysRev.48.73.
- Einstein, Albert & Rosen, Nathan (1937). "On Gravitational waves". Journal of the Franklin Institute. 223: 43–54. Bibcode:1937FrInJ.223...43E. doi:10.1016/S0016-0032(37)90583-0.
- Rosen, Nathan (1958). "Energy and momentum of cylindrical gravitational waves". Physical Review. 110 (1): 291. Bibcode:1958PhRv..110..291R. doi:10.1103/PhysRev.110.291. S2CID 122137402.
- Rosen, Nathan & Virbhadra, KS (1993). "Energy and momentum of cylindrical gravitational waves". General Relativity and Gravitation. 25 (4): 429–433. Bibcode:1993GReGr..25..429R. doi:10.1007/BF00757123. S2CID 128145567.
- Rosen, Nathan (1940). "General Relativity and Flat Space. I". Physical Review. 57 (2): 147. Bibcode:1940PhRv...57..147R. doi:10.1103/PhysRev.57.147.

== See also ==
- Rindler coordinates, for an account of the strange episode of Einstein and Rosen 1937
- Zero-energy universe

== Sources ==
- Peres, Asher. "Nathan Rosen." Technion Physics Department. 8 June 2009.
- December 18 - Today in Science
- George, Samuel Joseph. “The Einstein-Rosen Bridge.”
- PBS Online: Stephen Hawking’s Universe.
- Saxon, Wolfgang. Nathan Rosen, 86, of Israel; Physicist Worked With Einstein, The New York Times 23 Dec. 1995, sec. 1: 28.
