= List of contributors to general relativity =

This is a dynamic list of persons who have made major contributions to the (mainstream) development of general relativity, as acknowledged by standard texts on the subject. Some related lists are mentioned at the bottom of the page.

== A ==
- Peter C. Aichelburg (Aichelburg–Sexl ultraboost, generalized symmetries),
- Miguel Alcubierre (numerical relativity, Alcubierre drives),
- Richard L. Arnowitt (ADM formalism),
- Abhay Ashtekar (Ashtekar variables, dynamical horizons)

== B ==
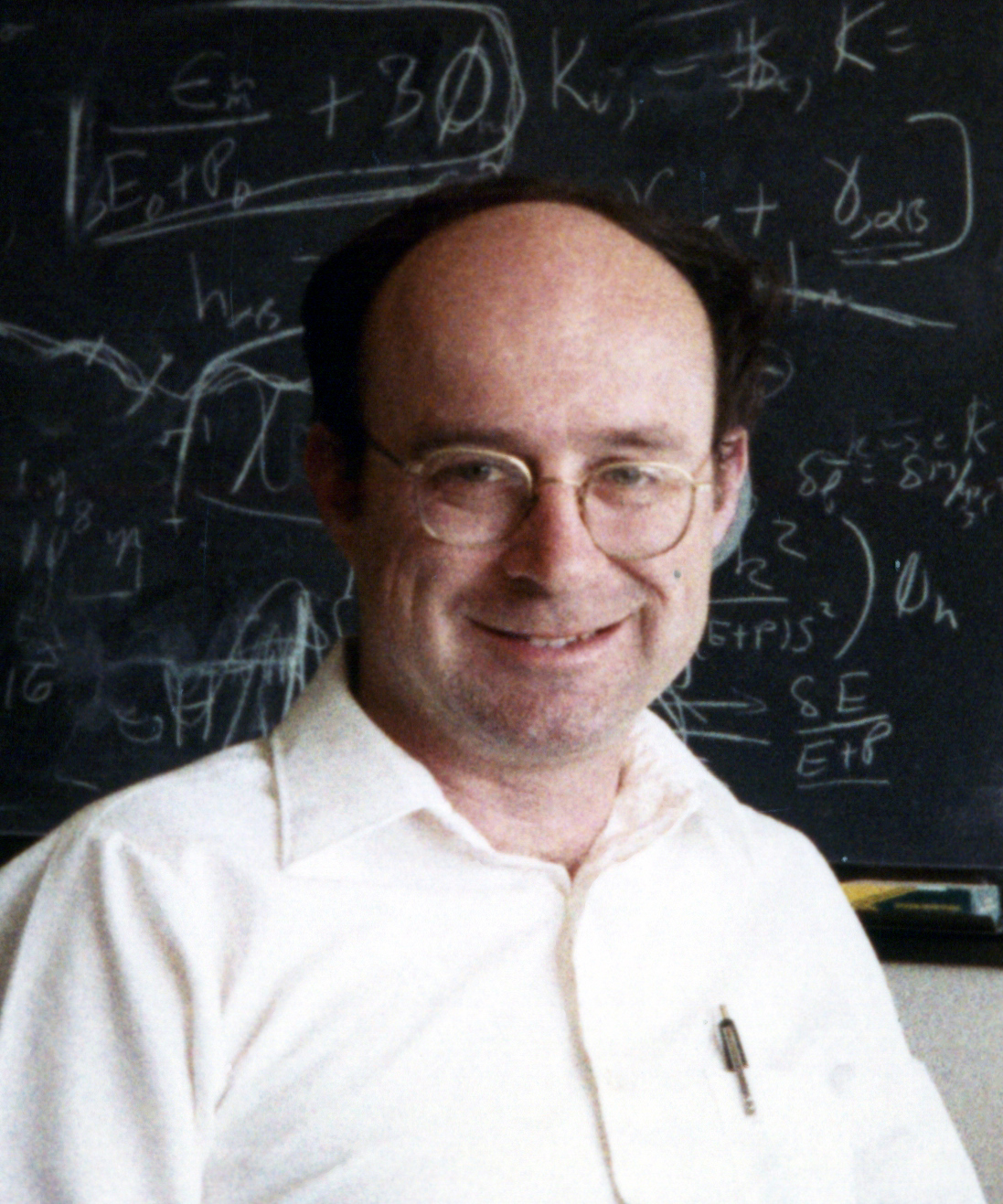
James M. Bardeen

- Robert M L Baker, Jr. (high-frequency gravitational waves),
- James M. Bardeen (Bardeen vacuum, black hole mechanics, gauge-invariant linear perturbations of Friedmann-Lemaître cosmologies),
- Barry Barish (LIGO builder, gravitational-waves observation),
- Robert Bartnik (existence of ADM mass for asymptotically flat vacuums, quasilocal mass),
- Jacob Bekenstein (black hole entropy),
- Vladimir A. Belinsky (BKL conjecture, inverse scattering transform solution generating methods),
- Peter G. Bergmann (constrained Hamiltonian dynamics),
- Bruno Bertotti (Bertotti–Robinson electrovacuum, post-Minskowskian expansions),
- Jiří Bičák (exact solutions of the Einstein field equations),
- Heinz Billing (prototype of laser interferometric gravitational-wave detector),
- George David Birkhoff (Birkhoff's theorem),
- Hermann Bondi (gravitational radiation, Bondi radiation chart, Bondi mass–energy–momentum, LTB dust, maverick models),
- William B. Bonnor (Bonnor beam solution),
- Robert H. Boyer (Boyer–Lindquist coordinates),
- Vladimir Braginsky (gravitational-wave detector, quantum nondemolition (QND) measurement)
- Carl H. Brans (Brans–Dicke theory),
- Hubert Bray (Riemannian Penrose inequality),
- Hans Adolph Buchdahl (Buchdahl fluid, Buchdahl theorem),
- Claudio Bunster (BTZ black hole, Surface terms in Hamiltonian formulation),
- Alessandra Buonanno (effective one-body formalism),
- William L. Burke (Burke potential, textbook)

== C ==
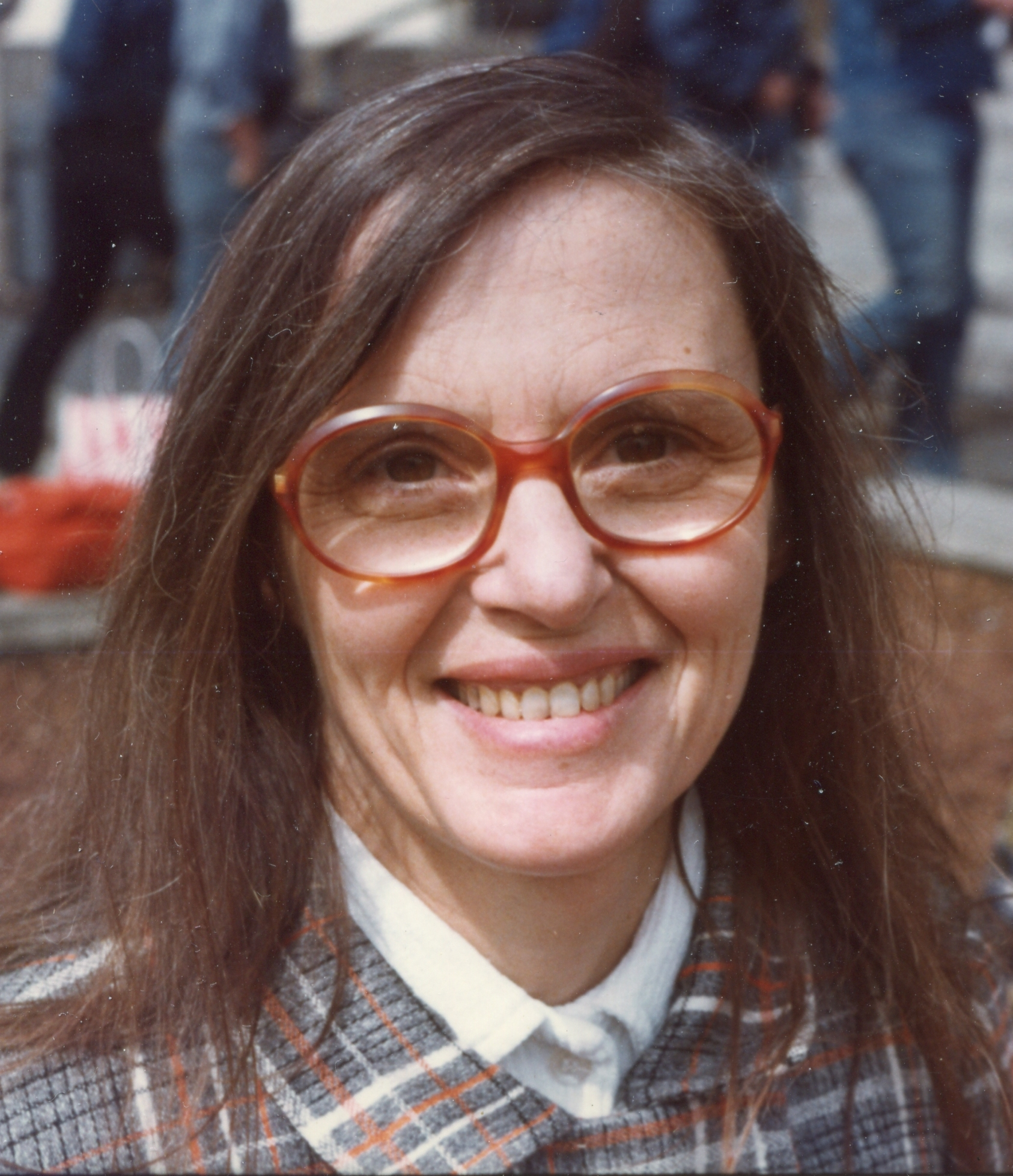
Yvonne Choquet-Bruhat

- Bernard Carr (self-similarity hypothesis, primordial black holes),
- Brandon Carter (no-hair theorem, Carter constant, black-hole mechanics, variational principle for Ernst vacuums),
- Subrahmanyan Chandrasekhar (Chandrasekhar limit, colliding plane waves, quasinormal modes, relativistic stars, monograph (Note: The Mathematical Theory of Black Holes.)),
- Jean Chazy (Chazy-Curzon vacuum),
- Yvonne Choquet-Bruhat (formerly Yvonne Bruhat; local existence and uniqueness of solutions to the vacuum Einstein equations, initial value formulations, textbook),
- Demetrios Christodoulou (naked singularity in LTB dust, stability of Minkowski vacuum),
- Orest Chwolson (gravitational lensing),
- Alejandro Corichi (fundamental contributions to quantum gravity and loop quantum gravity)

== D ==
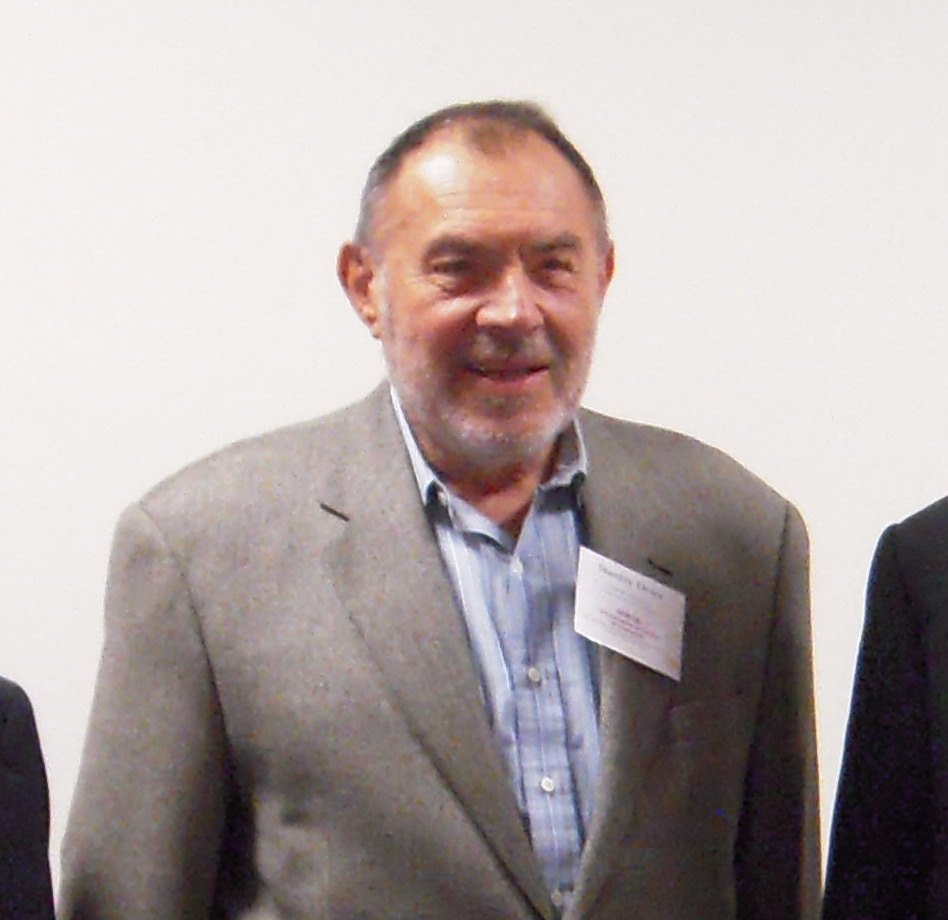
Stanley Deser

- Thibault Damour (effective one-body formalism),
- Georges Darmois (matching conditions, Darmois vacuum),
- Stanley Deser (ADM initial value formulation, effective field theory),
- Bryce DeWitt (Wheeler–DeWitt equation),
- Robert H. Dicke (Brans–Dicke theory, parametrized post-Newtonian (PPN) formalism, background radiation),
- Paul A.M. Dirac (graviton, monograph),
- Tevian Dray (asymptotic structure, gravitational shock waves),
- Ronald Drever (LIGO, gravitational-wave detectors and observation)

== E ==
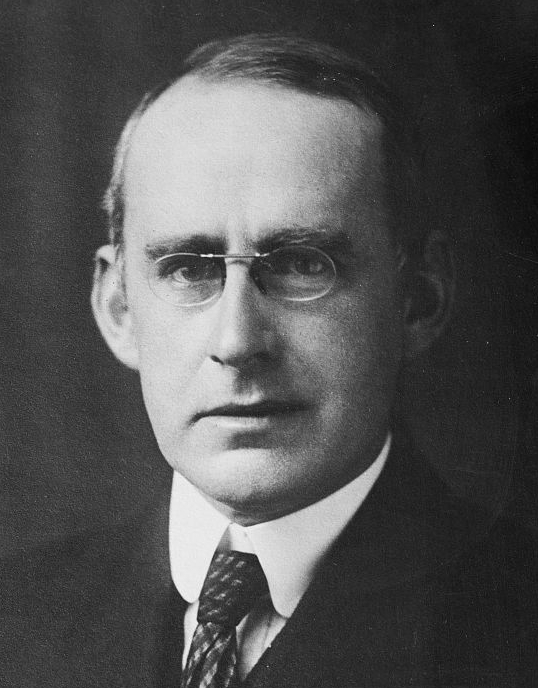
Arthur Stanley Eddington

- Arthur Stanley Eddington (early treatises, (Note: Mathematical Theory of Relativity and Internal Constitution of the Stars.) relativistic stars, Eddington–Finkelstein coordinates, role of curvature, post-Newtonian expansions, early tests and popularization of general relativity),
- Jürgen Ehlers (Ehlers vacuum family, symmetries of pp waves, spacetime view of gravitational lensing, Newtonian limit),
- Albert Einstein (creator of general relativity, principle of equivalence, Einstein field equations, gravitational time dilation, gravitational redshift, gravitational lensing, gravitational waves, perihelion of Mercury, cosmological constant, Einstein–Infeld–Hoffmann equations, Einstein–Rosen bridge),
- George F. R. Ellis (relativistic cosmological models, classification of curvature singularities, averaging problem in cosmology, gauge-invariant linear perturbations of spatially homogeneous cosmologies, "small universes," monograph, Virbhadra–Ellis lens equation),
- Frederick J. Ernst (Ernst vacuum family, Ernst equation, solution generating methods, Ernst–Wild electrovacuum),
- Loránd Eötvös (Eötvös experiment)

== F ==
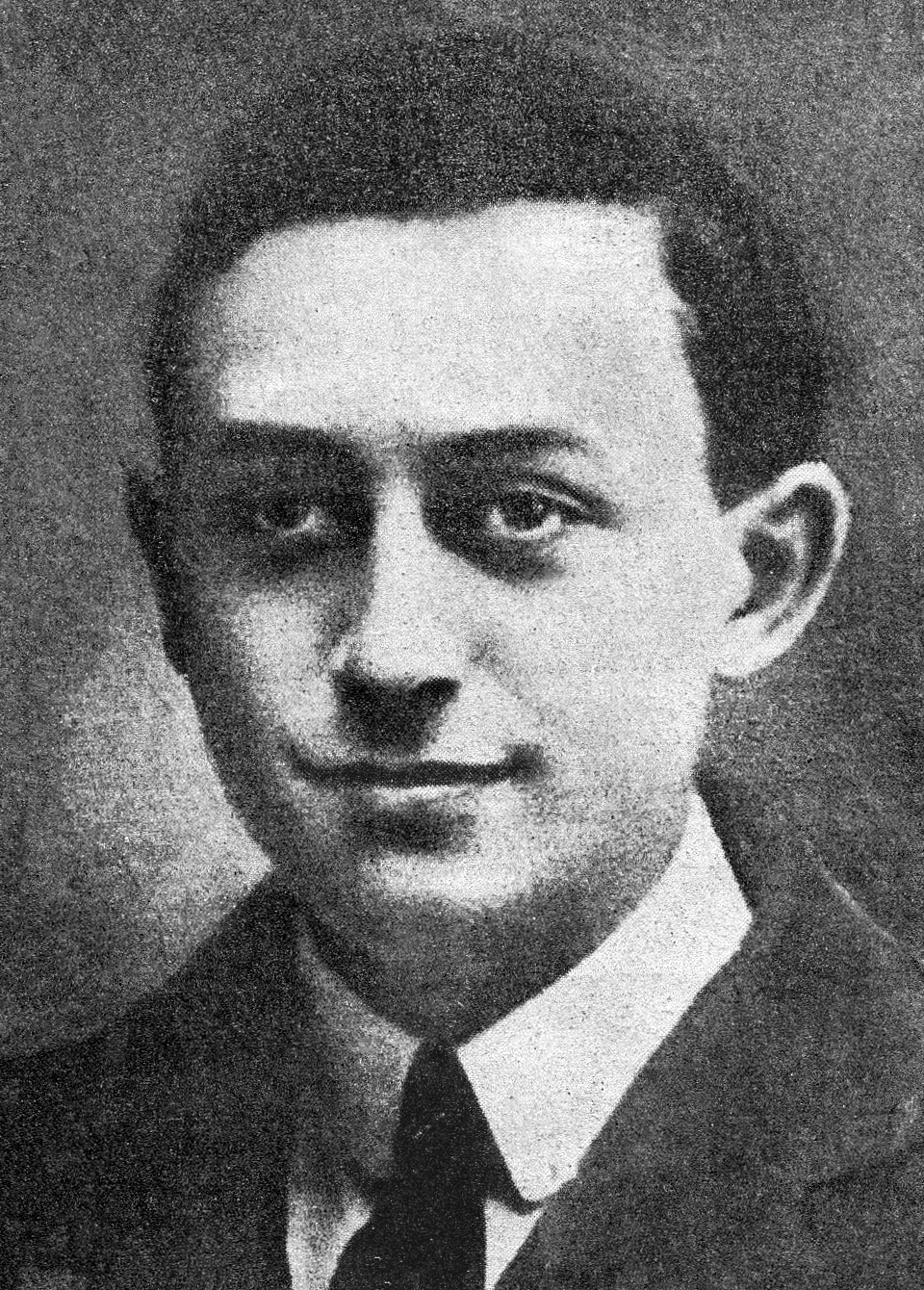
Enrico Fermi

- Enrico Fermi (Fermi coordinates, Fermi–Walker transport),
- Richard Feynman (sticky bead argument [as 'Mr. Smith'], supermassive stars, derivation of the Einstein field equations from quantum field theory, Feynman Lectures on Gravitation),
- David Finkelstein (Eddington–Finkelstein coordinates),
- Vladimir Aleksandrovich Fock (textbook, harmonic coordinates),
- Robert L. Forward (gravitational-wave detectors),
- William A. Fowler (relativistic stellar models, gravitational collapse),
- Alexander Friedmann (Friedmann cosmological models)

== G ==
- Robert P. Geroch (Geroch group, singularity theorems, GHP formalism),
- Kurt Gödel (Gödel dust solution, closed timelike curves),
- Robert H. Gowdy (Gowdy solutions),
- Marcel Grossmann (taught Einstein the necessary mathematical tools for general relativity),
- Allvar Gullstrand (Gullstrand–Painlevé coordinates)

== H ==
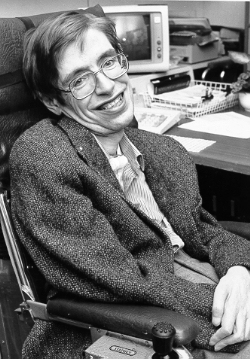
Stephen Hawking

- Yusuke Hagihara (Schwarzschild geodesics),
- Mustafa Halilsoy Nutku-Halil solution for colliding waves, On the Nutku—Halil solution for colliding impulsive gravitational waves
- James Hartle (quantum cosmology, textbook),
- Stephen Hawking (Hawking-Penrose singularity theorems, Hawking radiation, black-hole thermodynamics, monograph, Gibbons-Hawking-York boundary term),
- Charles W. Hellaby (cosmological models),
- David Hilbert (Hilbert's action principle),
- Banesh Hoffmann (EIH approximation),
- Fred Hoyle (steady-state cosmology),
- Russell Hulse (Hulse–Taylor pulsar)

== I ==
- Leopold Infeld (Einstein–Infeld–Hoffmann equations),
- Richard A. Isaacson (energy–momentum complex),
- James A. Isenberg (initial value formulations, gluing construction),
- Werner Israel (no-hair theorem, tidal forces around black hole singularities, black hole interiors and mass inflation)

== J ==
- Theodore Jacobson (thermodynamic derivation of Einstein's field equation),
- Jørg Tofte Jebsen (Birkhoff's theorem),
- George Barker Jeffery (Baldwin–Jeffery plane wave),
- Pascual Jordan (Jordan–Brans–Dicke theory)

== K ==
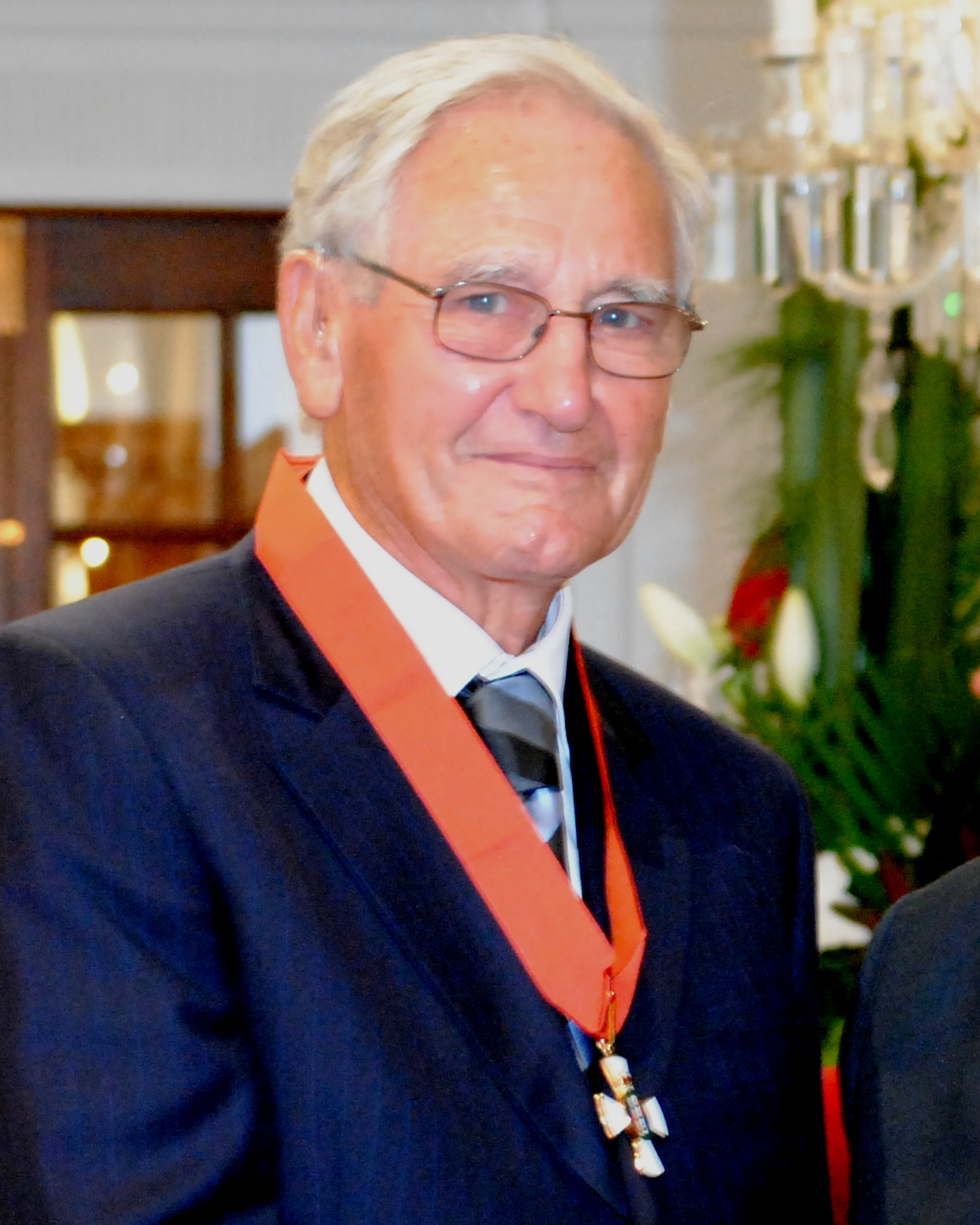
Roy Patrick Kerr

- Niky Kamran (wave equations in black hole space-times),
- Ronald Kantowski (Kantowski-Sachs fluids),
- Anders Karlhede (Cartan–Karlhede classification),
- Edward Kasner (Kasner dust solution),
- Roy Patrick Kerr (Kerr vacuum, Kerr–Schild metrics, use of Lie groups in relativity, Kerr–Farnsworth ansatz),
- Isaak Markovich Khalatnikov (BKL conjecture),
- William Morris Kinnersley (photon rocket),
- Sergiu Klainerman (global stability of Minkowski vacuum),
- Oskar Klein (Klein fluid, Kaluza–Klein theories),
- Arthur Komar (Komar energy–momentum integrals),
- Erich Kretschmann (Kretschmann invariant),
- Martin Kruskal (Kruskal–Szekeres coordinates for Schwarzschild vacuum),
- Wolfgang Kundt (EK classification of symmetries of pp waves)

== L ==
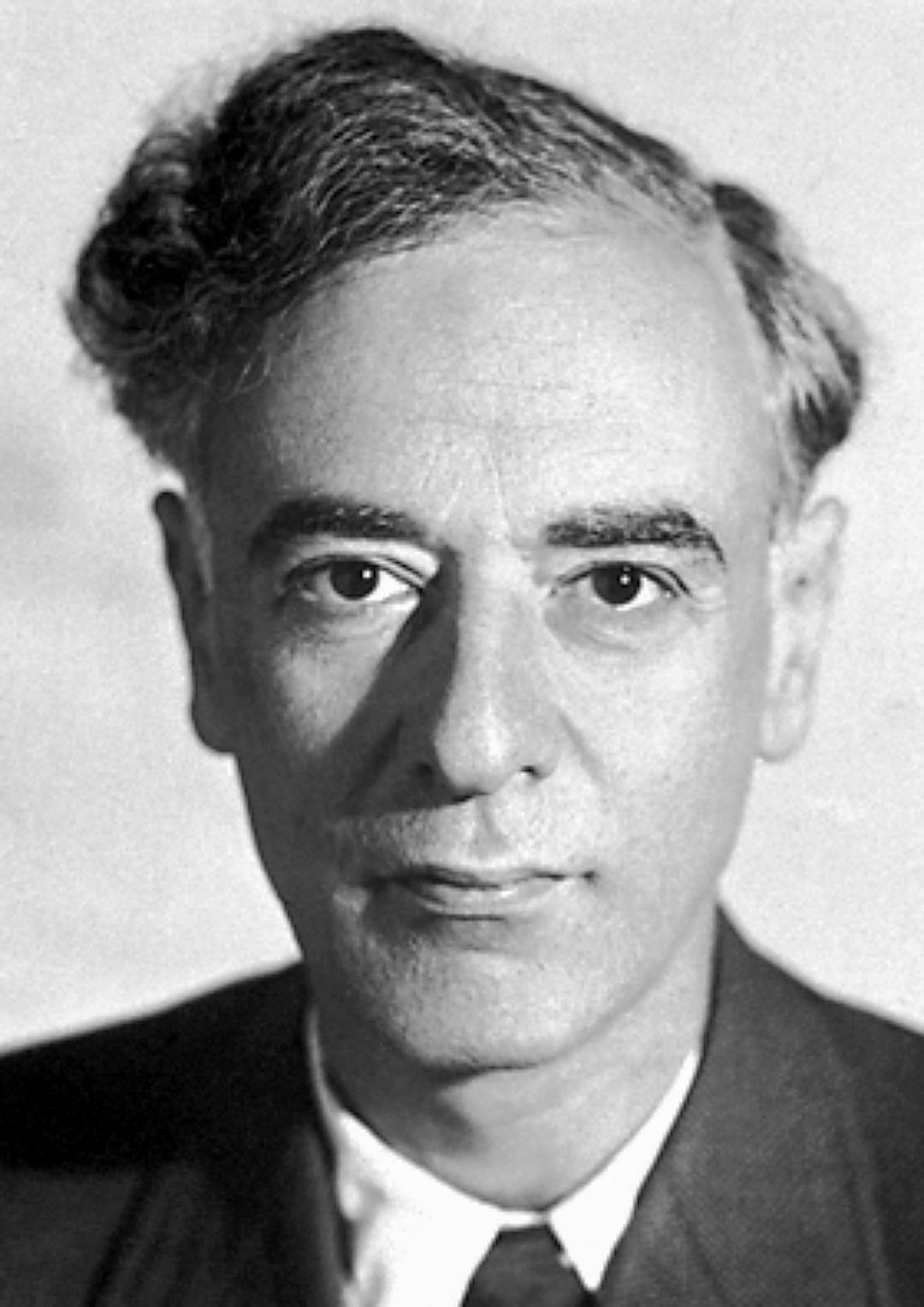
Lev Landau

- Cornelius Lanczos (Lanczos tensor, Lanczos–van Stockum dust),
- Lev D. Landau (Landau–Lifshitz formulation, textbook (Note: See Course on Theoretical Physics, Volume 2.)),
- Georges-Henri Lemaître (cosmological model, LTB dust, Lemaître chart on Schwarzschild vacuum),
- Josef Lense (Lense–Thirring precession),
- Tullio Levi-Civita (static vacuums, C-metric; see also related list below),
- André Lichnerowicz (3+1 formalism, matching conditions, Lichnerowicz equation),
- Evgeny M. Lifshitz (Landau–Lifschitz gravitational energy–momentum complex, BKL conjecture, textbook),
- Alan P. Lightman (problem book),
- Casey Lilly (gravitational wave theory in general relativity)
- Hendrik Lorentz (Hamilton's principle, coordinate-free formulation),
- David Lovelock (Lovelock theory, Lovelock's theorem)

== M ==
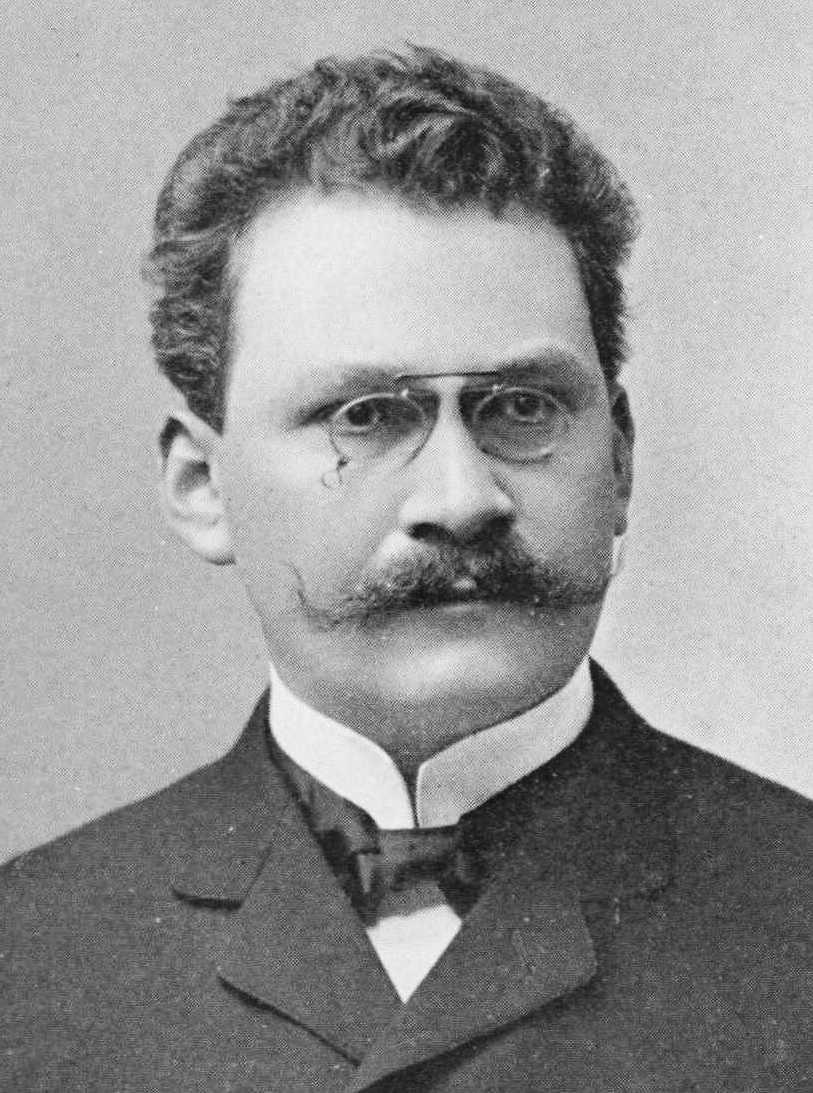
Hermann Minkowski

- Donald Marolf (black hole firewall paradox, shock singularity)
- R. G. McLenaghan (CM invariants),
- Reinhard Meinel (Neugebauer–Meinel dust disk solution),
- Hermann Minkowski (Minkowski spacetime),
- Charles W. Misner (mixmaster model, ADM initial value formulation, ADM mass, textbook)
- John Moffat (various classical gravitation theories)
- Vincent Moncrief (global properties of spatially compact dynamical vacuum spacetimes),
- C. Møller (energy–momentum complex),
- Moustafa Mosharafa (relation of radiation, mass and energy)

== N ==
- Gernot Neugebauer (Neugebauer–Meinel dust disk solution),
- Ezra Ted Newman (Newman–Penrose formalism, Kerr–Newman black hole solution, Janis–Newman–Winicour solution, NUT vacuum, RT spacetimes, relation of lensing to Weyl tensor),
- Gunnar Nordström (Reissner–Nordström metric),
- Kenneth Nordtvedt (Nordtvedt effect, PPN formalism),
- Igor D. Novikov (Novikov chart in Schwarzschild vacuum, no-hair theorem, accretion disks around black holes, monograph)
- Yavuz Nutku Nutku-Halil solution for colliding waves, On the Nutku—Halil solution for colliding impulsive gravitational waves

== O ==
- Robert Oppenheimer (gravitational collapse, Oppenheimer–Volkoff limit, Tolman–Oppenheimer–Volkoff equation, Oppenheimer–Snyder model),
- Amos Ori (black hole interiors, mass inflation, shock singularity, time machines, radiation reaction, gravitational collapse)

== P ==
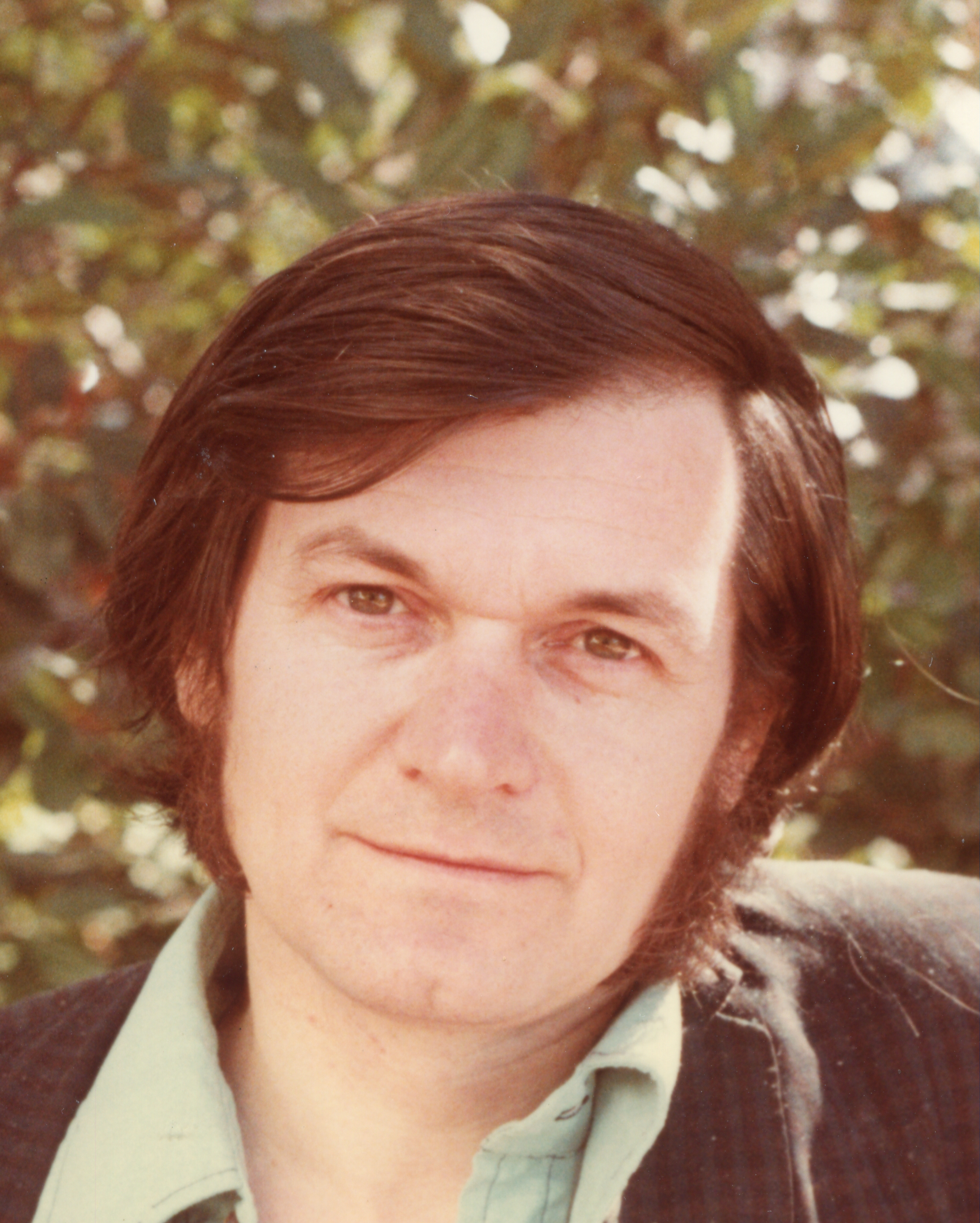
Roger Penrose

- Achilles Papapetrou (chart for Ernst vacuum family, Majumdar–Papapetrou electrovacuums, Dixon–Papapetrou equations),
- Paul Painlevé (Gullstrand–Painlevé coordinates),
- Roger Penrose (Hawking–Penrose singularity theorems, Penrose diagrams, techniques from algebraic geometry and differential topology, Penrose limits, cosmic censorship hypotheses, Penrose inequalities, geometry of gravitational plane waves, impulsive waves, Penrose–Khan colliding plane wave, Newman–Penrose formalism, Weyl curvature hypothesis, highly influential monograph (Note: Techniques of Differential Topology in Relativity.)),
- Alexei Zinovievich Petrov (Petrov classification of algebraic properties of Weyl curvature tensor),
- Tsvi Piran (gravitational collapse),
- Felix A. E. Pirani (gravitational radiation, Petrov–Pirani classification of algebraic properties of Weyl curvature tensor),
- Jerzy F. Plebański (Plebanski vacuum, Plebanski action),
- Eric Poisson (black hole interiors, mass inflation, post-Newtonian approximation, monographs (Note: A Relativist's Toolkit: The Mathematics of Black-hole Mechanics and Gravity: Newtonian, Post-Newtonian, Relativistic (with Clifford M. Will).)),
- William H. Press (gravitational-wave astronomy, problem book),
- Frans Pretorius (numerical relativity simulation),
- Richard H. Price (Price's theorem, books)

== R ==
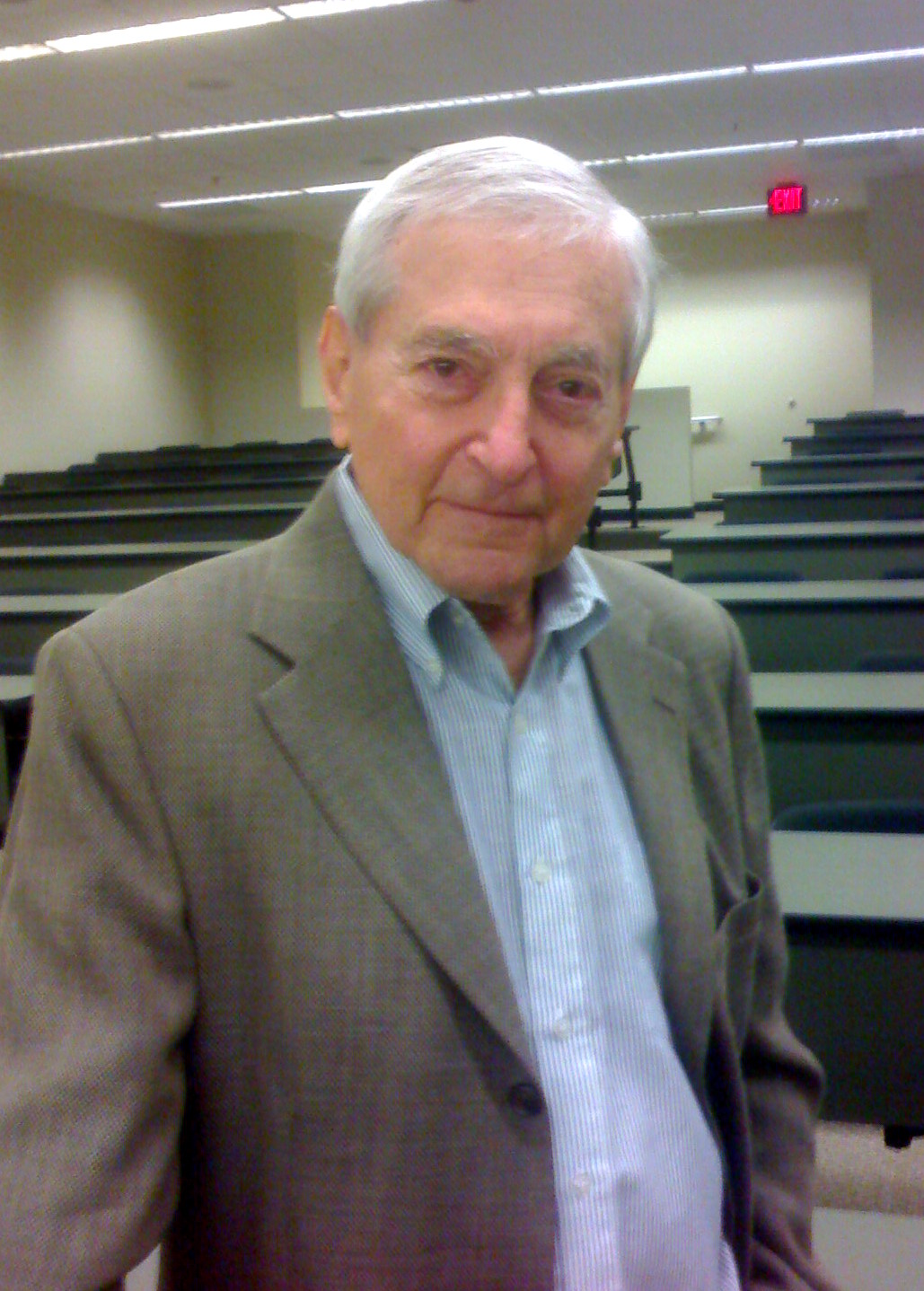
Wolfgang Rindler

- George Yuri Rainich (Rainich conditions),
- A. K. Raychaudhuri (Raychaudhuri equation),
- Tullio Regge (Regge calculus),
- Hans Reissner (Reissner–Nordström metric),
- Wolfgang Rindler (Rindler chart for Minkowski vacuum),
- Hans Ringström (strong cosmic censorship holds for T3-Gowdy vacuums),
- Howard Percy Robertson (role of curvature, parametrized post-Newtonian formalism, Robertson–Walker metric),
- Ivor Robinson (Bel–Robinson tensor, Bertotti–Robinson electrovacuum),
- Alfonso Romero (research on Lorentzian and semi-Riemannian geometry)
- Nathan Rosen (Erez–Rosen solution, Einstein–Rosen bridge, Einstein–Rosen gravitational waves),
- Remo Ruffini (particle motion in black holes, textbook)

== S ==
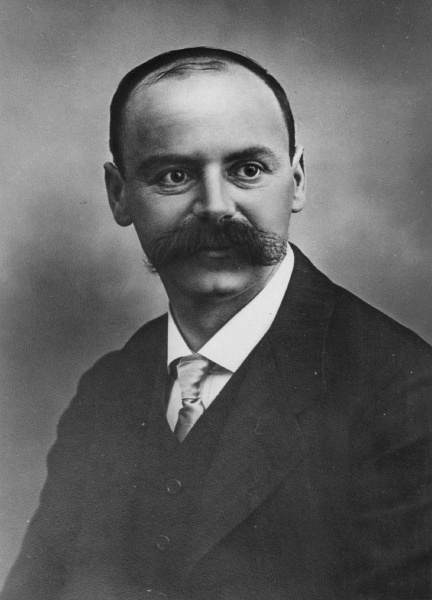
Karl Schwarzschild

- Rainer K. Sachs (peeling theorem, optical scalars, Kantowski–Sachs fluid solutions, Sachs–Wolfe effect, Bondi–Metzner–Sachs group),
- Andrei Dmitrievich Sakharov (vacuum fluctuations),
- Alfred Schild (Kerr–Schild metrics, Schild's ladder),
- Leonard Isaac Schiff (PPN formalism, textbook),
- Richard Schoen (positive energy theorem, gravitational shielding),
- Engelbert Schücking (Ozsváth–Schücking plane wave),
- Bernard F. Schutz (gravitational-wave detectors, textbook),
- Karl Schwarzschild (Schwarzschild solution, Schwarzschild radius, Event horizon, Schwarzschild vacuum, Schwarzschild fluid),
- Dennis William Sciama (Einstein–Cartan theory, role in legitimizing black hole concept),
- Roman Ulrich Sexl (Aichelburg–Sexl ultraboost),
- Irwin I. Shapiro (Shapiro effect, observational tests),
- Harlow Shapley (rotating cosmologies),
- Willem de Sitter (de Sitter space, de Sitter precession),
- Hartland Snyder (Oppenheimer–Snyder model),
- Hans Stephani (Stephani dust solution, monograph, textbook),
- Willem Jacob van Stockum (Lanczos–van Stockum dust),
- John Lighton Synge (global structure of Schwarzschild vacuum, world function, O'Brien–Synge matching conditions),
- George Szekeres (Kruskal–Szekeres coordinates for Schwarzschild vacuum)

== T ==
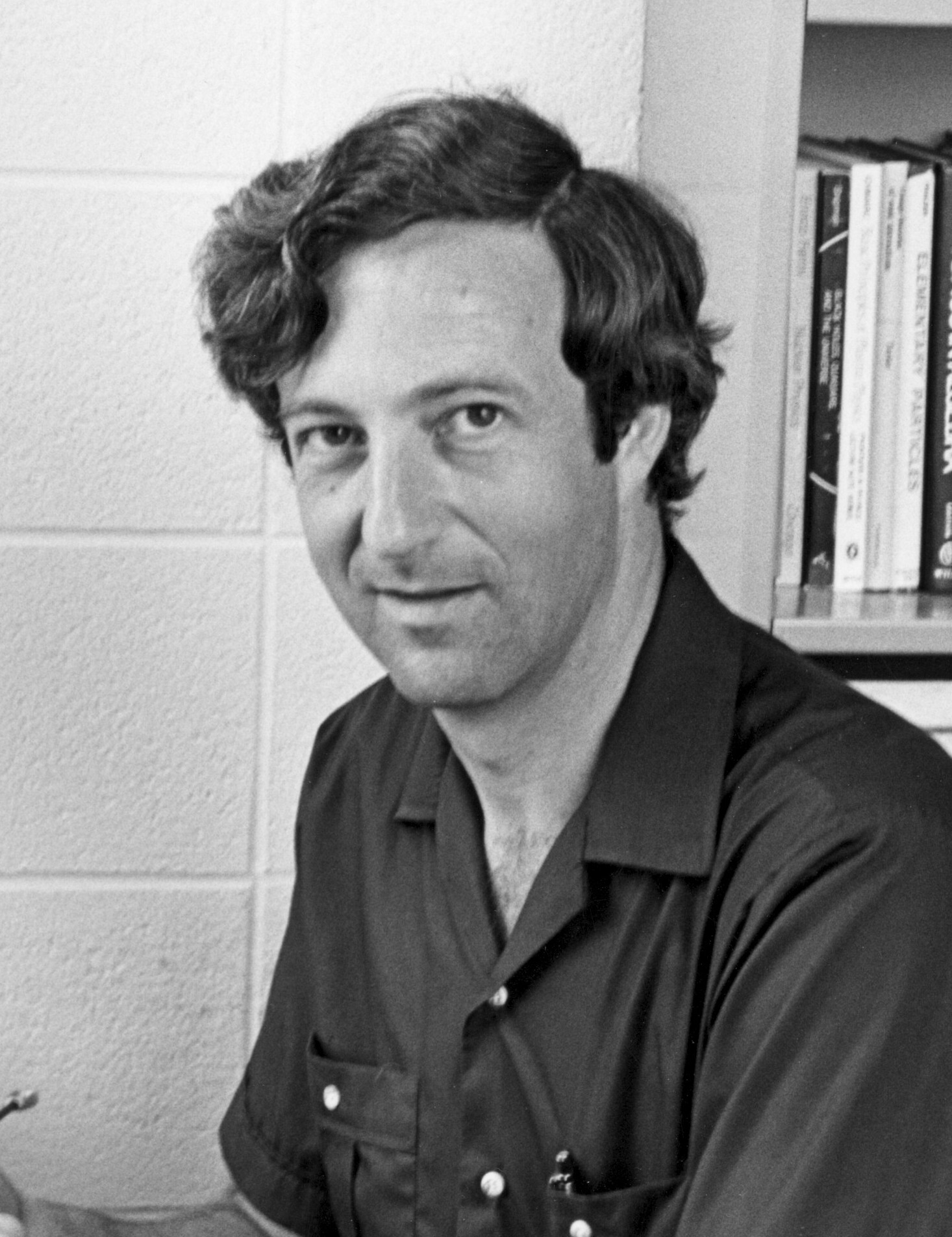
Saul Teukolsky

- Abraham Haskel Taub (Taub plane symmetric vacuum, Taub–NUT vacuum, vacuum solutions foliated by Bianchi manifolds, relativistic hydrodynamics),
- Joseph Taylor (Hulse–Taylor pulsar),
- Saul Teukolsky (Teukolsky equation, numerical relativity, problem book),
- Hans Thirring (Lense–Thirring precession),
- Kip Thorne (relativistic multipoles, relativistic stars, hoop conjecture, membrane paradigm, gravitational-wave detectors, textbook, wormholes, properties of black holes),
- Frank J. Tipler (classification of curvature singularities, Tipler cylinder),
- Richard Chase Tolman (Tolman surface brightness test, Tolman–Oppenheimer–Volkoff (TOV) equation, Tolman dust solutions, LTB dust),
- Andrzej Trautman (RT spacetimes)

== U ==
- William G. Unruh (Unruh radiation)

== V ==
- P. C. Vaidya (Vaidya metric, Vaidya–Patel metric),
- K. S. Virbhadra (Virbhadra–Ellis lens equation, relativistic images , photon surfaces , observational test for the weak cosmic censorship hypothesis ),
- George Volkoff (Tolman–Oppenheimer–Volkoff limit, Tolman–Oppenheimer–Volkoff equation)

== W ==
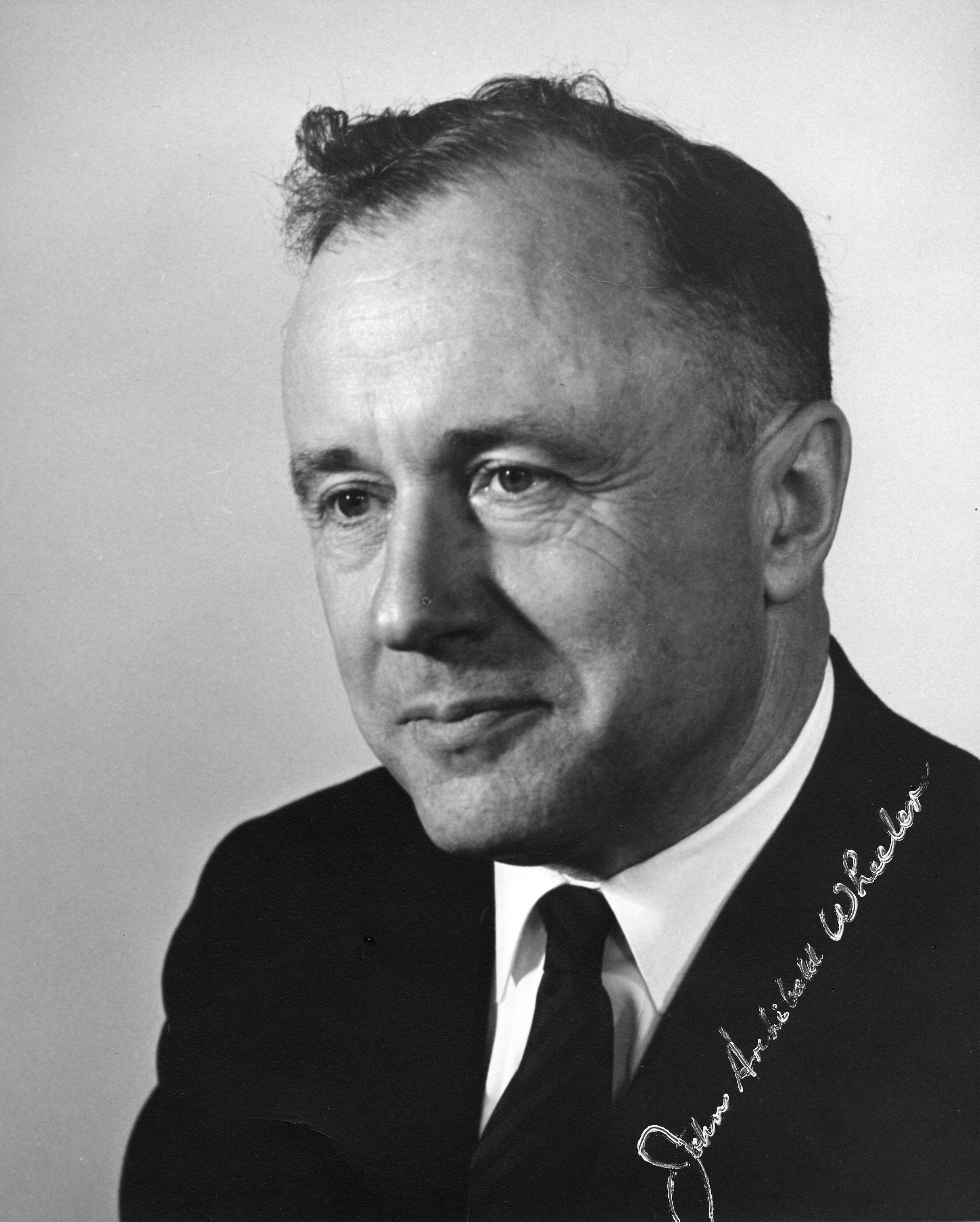
John Archibald Wheeler

- Robert M. Wald (textbook, black-hole perturbations, black-hole thermodynamics, electric fields outside a black hole, quantum field theory in curved spacetimes),
- Arthur Geoffrey Walker (Fermi–Walker derivatives, Robertson–Walker metric),
- Mu-Tao Wang (quasilocal mass-energy),
- Joseph Weber (gravitational-wave detectors),
- Rainer Weiss (LIGO, gravitational-waves observation),
- Peter Westervelt (indirect evidence for gravitational waves),
- Hermann Weyl (Weyl vacuums; see also related list below),
- John Archibald Wheeler (coined the terms "black holes" and "wormholes," geometrodynamics, relativistic stars, Zerilli–Wheeler equation, Wheeler–DeWitt equation, textbook),
- Paul S. Wesson (relativistic cosmology, Kaluza–Klein theory)
- Clifford Martin Will (parametrized post-Newtonian expansions, relativistic astrophysics, textbook (Note: Gravity: Newtonian, Post-Newtonian, Relativistic (with Eric Poisson).)),
- Edward Witten (positive energy theorem),
- Louis Witten (Witten electrovacuum solutions)

== X ==
- Basilis C. Xanthopoulos (Chandrasekhar–Xanthopoulos colliding plane wave)

== Y ==
- Shing-Tung Yau (positive energy theorem),
- James W. York (initial value formulation, Gibbons–Hawking–York boundary term)

== Z ==
- Vladimir E. Zakharov (inverse scattering transform solution generating method),
- Yakov Borisovich Zel'dovich (early evidence for no-hair theorem, early evidence of black-hole radiation, relativistic astrophysics)

== See also ==
- Contributors to the mathematical background for general relativity
- List of cosmologists
- List of loop quantum gravity researchers
- List of quantum gravity researchers
- Introduction to general relativity
- Timeline of gravitational physics and relativity
