= Bertotti =

Bertotti is an Italian surname. Notable people with the surname include:

- Bruno Bertotti (1930–2018), Italian physicist
- Florencia Bertotti (born 1983), Argentine actress, singer, songwriter, and businesswoman
- Mike Bertotti (born 1970), American baseball player
