= Cécile Renault (astrophysicist) =

French astrophysicist (1970–2021)

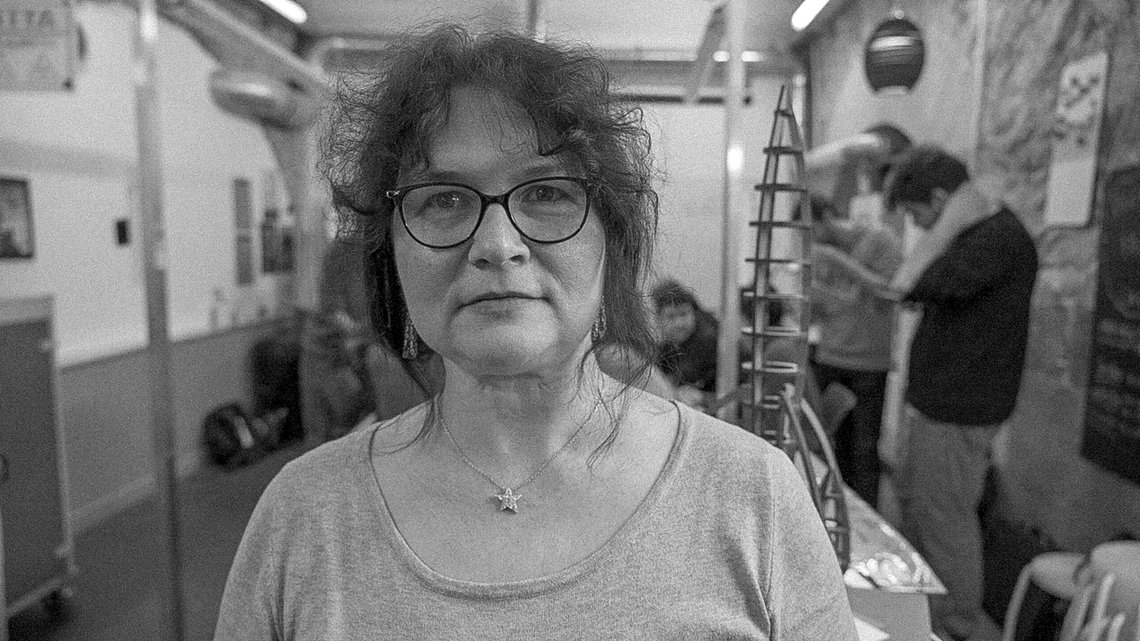
- Born: 19 September 1970; Amiens, France
- Died: 5 April 2021
- Occupation: Astrophysicist
- Spouse: Aurélien Barrau
- Scientific career
- Thesis: Recherche de matiere noire galactique par effet de microlentille gravitationnelle sous forme d'objects compacts de faible masse (1996)

Cécile Renault (19 September 1970 – 5 April 2021) was a French astrophysicist who specialized in cosmology. She was widely known for her work on the Planck space observatory.

== Biography ==
Renault studied astronomy under the direction of Jean-Pierre Chieze and Thibault Damour. She started off working at the Saclay Nuclear Research Centre, the Max Planck Society, the Laboratory of nuclear and high energy physics, and the Laboratory of Subatomic Physics and Cosmology in Grenoble.

During the launch and operation of the Planck, Renault studied high frequencies and fossil radiation surrounding the spacecraft. She became known to the public for her popular science works on the spacecraft. She also contributed to the construction of the Vera C. Rubin Observatory in Chile.

Renault hosted the popular science blog "Cosmologiquement vôtre", which was renowned by Futura-Sciences and Florence Porcel.

She was married to fellow astrophysicist Aurélien Barrau. She was among the 200 people who contributed to the column Le Plus Grand Défi de l'histoire de l'humanité in Le Monde. Cécile Renault died in a car accident on 5 April 2021.
