= Ernst Schmutzer =

German physicist (1930–2022)

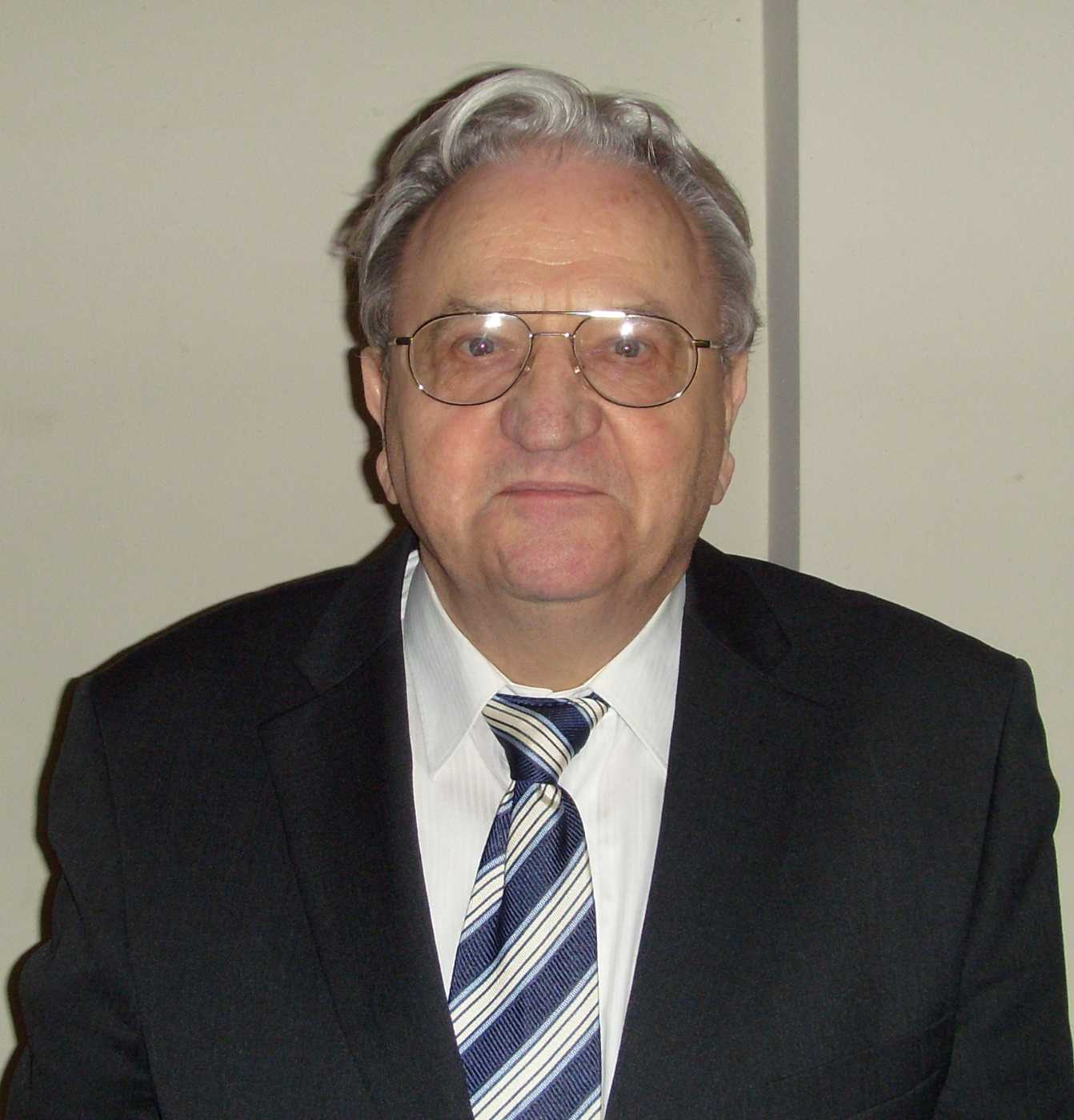
- Schmutzer in 2010
- Born: 26 February 1930; Labuť, Czechoslovakia
- Died: 20 February 2022 (aged 91)
- Occupations: Theoretical physicist University lecturer Writer

Academic work
- Doctoral students: Hans Stephani

Ernst Schmutzer (26 February 1930 – 20 February 2022) was a German theoretical physicist.

== Life ==
=== Early years ===
Ernst Schmutzer was born in 1930 in a small village in western Bohemia, which at that time had been part of Czechoslovakia for slightly more than a decade. By May 1945, when the war ended, he had attended schools in three different local villages. The area was occupied by the Americans on 1 May 1945, and less than a year later the entire German speaking population had been expelled. Schmutzer's schooling continued across the border in Weiden. By the time he passed his school final exams in 1949 he had been relocated again, this time to Waren (Müritz) in the northern part of what had at the time been designated the Soviet occupation zone in what remained of Germany. A few months later, in October 1949, the occupation zone was re-founded as the German Democratic Republic (East Germany).

=== Career progress ===
He studied at the University of Rostock, obtaining his first degree in 1953 and his doctorate just two years later. His dissertation, for which he was supervised by Hans Falkenhagen, concerned Electrolyte. After this, in 1955 he obtained a position as a research assistant at the Friedrich Schiller University of Jena which is where in 1958 he obtained his habilitation (a higher academic qualification). He obtained a lectureship at Jena in 1959 and in 1960 a professorship (with a teaching contract) in Theoretical physics. From 1968 till 1990 he was in charge of the "Relativistic Physics" field at Jena, serving between 1974 and 1978 as Dean of the Mathematics, Natural Sciences and Engineering faculty. Between 1990 and his retirement in 1993 he was Rector of Jena's Friedrich Schiller University in succession to Hans Schmigalla.

=== Focus ===
Schmutzer was concerned with the Theories of Relativity and Gravitation. He investigated extensions of General relativity theory in a supplementary spatial dimension which he termed "Projective Unified Field Theory" ("Projektive Einheitliche Feldtheorie"), extrapolating from the ideas of Theodor Kaluza. This invokes five space-time dimensions including a massive supplementary scalar field which, according to Schmutzer, can serve as an explanation for the accelerating expansion of the universe identified in the 1990s (as a candidate for dark energy) and for the Pioneer effect. According to Schmutzer's theory the singularities of General relativity theory are smoothed, so that instead of a "Big bang" singularity, matter begins with a more gentle progression which Schmutzer termed an "Urstart".

=== Politics ===
Politics was peripheral to Ernst Schmutzer's career, but in the German Democratic Republic it was hard to entirely ignore the country's ruling Socialist Unity Party. He joined the SED (party) in 1949, but was then expelled from it in 1958. The official report contained the conclusions that Schmutzer was in a fundamental disagreement with Party Policy regarding the practical transformation of the university. Following months of discussions in which Dr. Schmutzer had shown total disregard for party policy regarding scientific work, the conclusion was reached that his membership in the party could only be damaging to it, and he was expelled from the party. Political exclusion turned out less damaging to Schmutzer's career than might have been anticipated. He was one of just a handful of Jena professors permitted to visit western universities as a guest lecturer. In 1967 he taught at Queen Mary College in London.

=== International reputation ===
Schmutzer became one of East Germany's leading theoretical physicists. An internationally recognised authority on Gravitational Physics, in 1979 he was able to celebrate Albert Einstein's centenary by attracting to Jena the "9th International Conference on General Relativity and Gravitation" which took place in July 1980. In Jena he created a School of Gravitation Physics, members of which include Hans Stephani, Dietrich Kramer and Eduard Herlt, and which has established a name for itself, most notably, with investigation of precise solutions for the Einstein field equations. Between 1980 and 1990 he was a principal editor of the scientific journal "Experimentelle Technik der Physik".

Ernst Schmutzer: Publications (selection)

- Relativistische Physik. Teubner 1968
- Symmetrien und Erhaltungssätze der Physik. Berlin, Akademie Verlag 1972
- Galileo Galilei. Teubner 1979, Verlag Harri Deutsch 1989
- Relativitätstheorie aktuell – ein Beitrag zur Einheit der Physik. Verlag Harri Deutsch 1981, Teubner, 1989, 1996, ISBN 3519032260
- Mathematik. Ein Kompendium für Physiker. Wiley VCH 2003
- Projektive einheitliche Feldtheorie. Verlag Harri Deutsch 2004, ISBN 3-8171-1726-4
- Grundlagen der theoretischen Physik. Wiley VCH, 3rd edition, 2005, 2 Vols (ca. 2300 pages), BI Verlag 1989 in 2 Vols and in 2nd edition Deutscher Verlag der Wissenschaften, Berlin 1991 in 4 Vols
- Fünfdimensionale Physik - Projektive Einheitliche Feldtheorie mit Einbeziehung der Quantentheorie (Mechanik, Astrophysik, Kosmologie ohne Urknall, Spinoren) Wissenschaftsverlag Thüringen, Langewiesen, 2009, ISBN 978-3-936404-47-0

Schmutzer's published output includes a comprehensive textbook on Theoretical Physics as well as an Introduction to Relativity Theory. His latest volume, "Fünfdimensionale Physik" ("Five Dimensional Physics"), appeared in 2009 and was republished in 2014.

== Awards, honours and memberships ==
- 1969: Member Academy of Sciences Leopoldina
- 1977: Carus Medal and Carus Prize from the city of Schweinfurt (awarded by the Leopoldina Academy)
- 1978: Service Medal from the Charles University in Prague
- 1981: National Prize of East Germany
- 1990: Corresponding Member German Academy of Sciences at Berlin (till 1992)
- 1990: Member Academy of Practical and Applied Sciences at Erfurt
- 1991: Member Saxonian Academy of Sciences and Humanities
- 1995: Member Sudeten-German Academy of Arts and Sciences
- 2005: Name entered in the "Golden Book" of the City of Jena

In Jena Ernst Schmutzer was an honorary member of the Burschenschaft Arminia auf dem Burgkeller (Arminius Student Fraternity of the City [hostelry] Cellar).
