= Alberto Vecchio =

Italian astrophysicist

- Born: Mantua, Italy
- Citizenship: Italian
- Education: University of Pavia (Laurea); University of Milan (PhD)
- Known for: Gravitational-wave parameter estimation, LISA science, Advanced LIGO
- Awards: Special Breakthrough Prize in Fundamental Physics (2016); Royal Society Wolfson Research Merit Award
- Scientific career
- Fields: Gravitational-wave astronomy, astrophysics
- Workplaces: University of Birmingham
- Doctoral advisor: Bruno Bertotti
- Doctoral students: Chiara Mingarelli
- Website: www.sr.bham.ac.uk/~av/

Alberto Vecchio (Italian pronunciation: [alˈbɛrto ˈvɛkkjo]) is an Italian astrophysicist and Professor of Astrophysics at the University of Birmingham, where he is the founding Director of the Institute for Gravitational Wave Astronomy. His research spans gravitational-wave astronomy across the frequency spectrum, including ground-based laser interferometry with LIGO and Virgo, pulsar timing arrays, and the future space-based Laser Interferometer Space Antenna (LISA). He is a member of the LIGO Scientific Collaboration team that made the first direct detection of gravitational waves in September 2015.

== Education ==
Vecchio studied theoretical physics as an undergraduate at Ghislieri College and the University of Pavia, graduating with a Laurea in 1991. He obtained a PhD in astronomy from the University of Milan in 1996, where he worked under Bruno Bertotti, a student of Erwin Schrödinger.

== Career ==
After completing his PhD, Vecchio held postdoctoral positions at Cardiff University and the Max Planck Institute for Gravitational Physics (Albert Einstein Institute) in Potsdam, where he subsequently worked as a research scientist. He joined the University of Birmingham as a lecturer in 2001 and was promoted to a Chair in Astrophysics in 2010. During the 2006–07 academic year, he was a visiting professor at Northwestern University.

At Birmingham, Vecchio founded the Institute for Gravitational Wave Astronomy and serves as its Director. He also heads the Astrophysics and Space Research group. He is a researcher at the Alan Turing Institute.

== Research ==
Vecchio's research focuses on using gravitational radiation to study the universe and to test gravity in extreme conditions. His work spans the astrophysics of compact objects, Bayesian data analysis techniques, and gravitational-wave observations across multiple frequency bands.

=== Ground-based detectors ===
Vecchio contributed to the development and construction of instrumentation for Advanced LIGO. He led the Compact Binary Coalescence Parameter Estimation group within the LIGO–Virgo Collaboration, developing Bayesian methods to extract the physical properties of gravitational wave sources such as binary black holes and binary neutron stars from detector data. He is a member of the LIGO Scientific Collaboration, the GEO Collaboration, and the LIGO–Virgo–KAGRA Collaboration. He was part of the team that detected gravitational waves from the first binary black hole merger, GW150914, in September 2015.

=== LISA ===
Vecchio has made significant contributions to the science case and data analysis methods for the planned Laser Interferometer Space Antenna. In a widely cited 2004 paper, he demonstrated that spin-induced precession in supermassive black hole binary systems would dramatically improve LISA's ability to measure source parameters, including sky localisation and luminosity distance. He is a member of the LISA Consortium and serves as Principal Investigator of the UK contribution to the LISA Science Ground Segment, leading a collaboration between the universities of Birmingham, Glasgow, Portsmouth, Southampton, and Cambridge.

=== Pulsar timing arrays ===
Vecchio is a member of the European Pulsar Timing Array (EPTA), serving on its steering committee, and the International Pulsar Timing Array (IPTA). His work in this area includes the stochastic gravitational-wave background from massive black hole binary populations and its implications for PTA observations.

== Students ==
Vecchio has supervised a number of doctoral students at the University of Birmingham, several of whom have gone on to academic research careers. His former PhD students include:

- Chiara Mingarelli (PhD 2014), who worked on gravitational-wave astrophysics with pulsar timing arrays, including the characterisation of anisotropy in the gravitational-wave background. She is now an Assistant Professor of Physics at Yale University and a member of the NANOGrav collaboration.
- Rory Smith (PhD 2013), who worked on detection and parameter estimation for coalescing compact binaries with advanced detectors.
- Katherine Grover (PhD 2015), who worked on sky localisation and tests of general relativity using gravitational waves from compact binary coalescence.
- Siyuan Chen (PhD 2018), who worked on constraining astrophysical models of supermassive black hole binary populations using pulsar timing arrays.
- Serena Vinciguerra (PhD 2018), who worked on studying neutron-star and black-hole binaries with gravitational waves.
- Riccardo Buscicchio (PhD 2022), who worked on Bayesian population inference for gravitational-wave astronomy.

== Awards and honours ==
- Special Breakthrough Prize in Fundamental Physics (2016), shared with the LIGO team for the detection of gravitational waves
- Royal Society Wolfson Research Merit Award
- Fellow of the Royal Astronomical Society (FRAS)

== Selected publications ==
- Vecchio, A. (2004). "LISA observations of rapidly spinning massive black hole binary systems". Physical Review D. 70 (4) 042001. arXiv:astro-ph/0304051. doi:10.1103/PhysRevD.70.042001.
- Sesana, A.; Vecchio, A.; Colacino, C.N. (2008). "The stochastic gravitational-wave background from massive black hole binary systems: implications for observations with Pulsar Timing Arrays". Monthly Notices of the Royal Astronomical Society. 390: 192. arXiv:0804.4476. doi:10.1111/j.1365-2966.2008.13682.x.
- Veitch, J.; Vecchio, A. (2010). "Bayesian coherent analysis of in-spiral gravitational wave signals with a detector network". Physical Review D. 81 (6) 062003. arXiv:0911.3820. doi:10.1103/PhysRevD.81.062003.
- Veitch, J.; et al. (2015). "Parameter estimation for compact binaries with ground-based gravitational-wave observations using the LALInference software library". Physical Review D. 91 (4) 042003. arXiv:1409.7215. doi:10.1103/PhysRevD.91.042003.
