= Staré Sedliště =

- Municipality
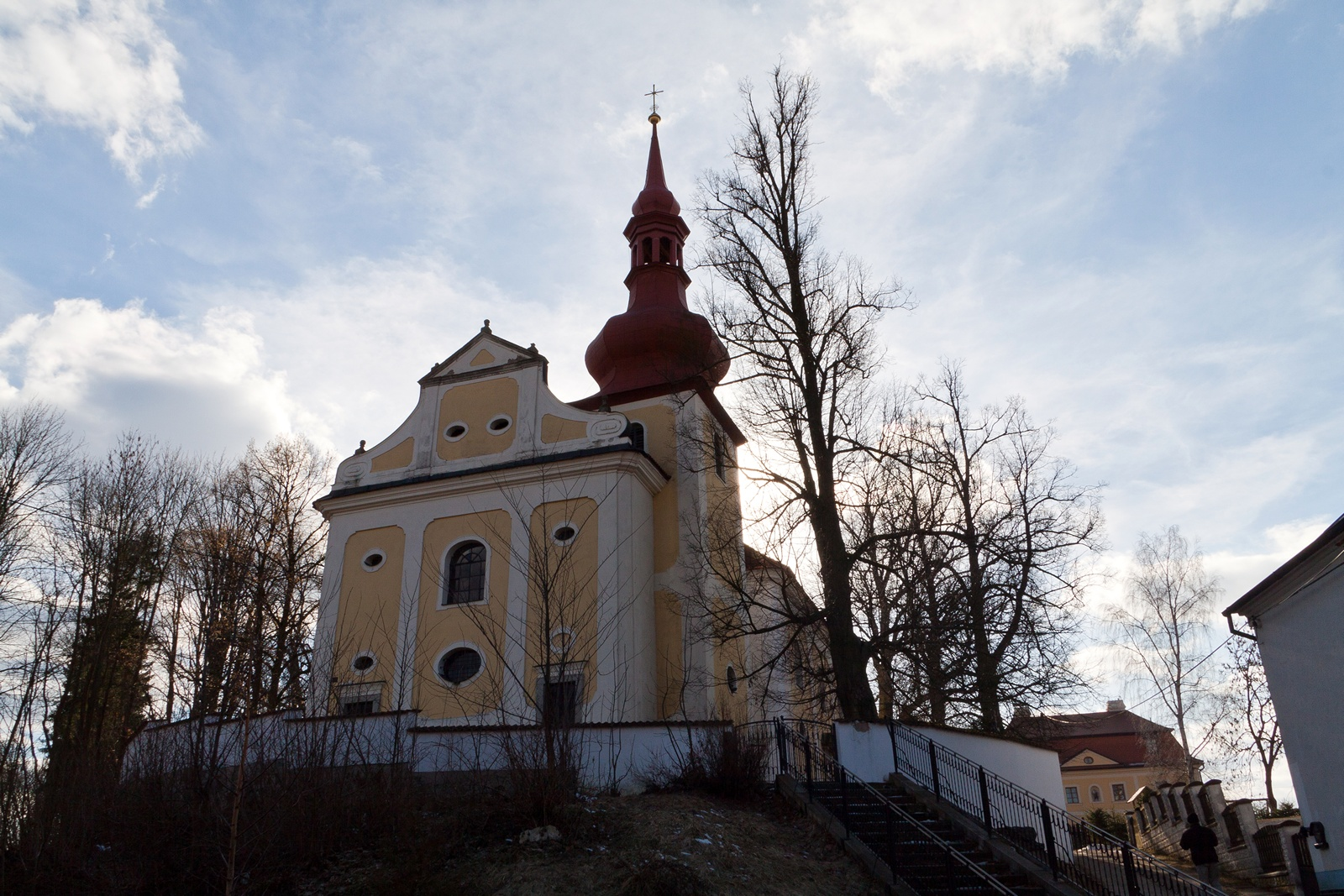
- Church of Saints Procopius and Ulrich

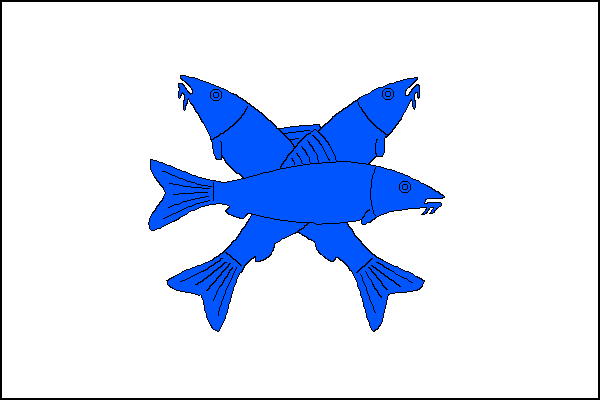
- Flag Coat of arms

- Location in the Czech Republic
- Coordinates: 49°44′49″N 12°42′9″E
- Country: Czech Republic
- Region: Plzeň
- District: Tachov
- First mentioned: 1177

Area
  - Total: 37.36 km^{2} (14.42 sq mi)
- Elevation: 512 m (1,680 ft)

Population (2026-01-01)
  - Total: 1,336
  - Density: 35.76/km^{2} (92.62/sq mi)
- Time zone: UTC+1 (CET)
  - Summer (DST): UTC+2 (CEST)
- Postal code: 348 01
- Website: www.ssedliste.cz

Staré Sedliště is a municipality and village in Tachov District in the Plzeň Region of the Czech Republic. It has about 1,300 inhabitants.

Staré Sedliště lies approximately 9 kilometres (6 mi) south-east of Tachov, 49 km (30 mi) west of Plzeň, and 129 km (80 mi) west of Prague.

== Administrative division ==
Staré Sedliště consists of five municipal parts (in brackets population according to the 2021 census):

- Staré Sedliště (745)
- Labuť (98)
- Mchov (42)
- Nové Sedliště (129)
- Úšava (176)

== Demographics ==
Historical population
| Year | Pop. | ±% |
|---|---|---|
| 1869 | 3,810 | — |
| 1880 | 3,992 | +4.8% |
| 1890 | 3,868 | −3.1% |
| 1900 | 3,884 | +0.4% |
| 1910 | 3,891 | +0.2% |
| 1921 | 3,605 | −7.4% |
| 1930 | 3,335 | −7.5% |
| 1950 | 1,101 | −67.0% |
| 1961 | 1,106 | +0.5% |
| 1970 | 1,023 | −7.5% |
| 1980 | 924 | −9.7% |
| 1991 | 971 | +5.1% |
| 2001 | 974 | +0.3% |
| 2011 | 1,142 | +17.2% |
| 2021 | 1,190 | +4.2% |
Source: Censuses

== Notable people ==
- Ernst Schmutzer (1930–2022), German theoretical physicist
