= Post-Minkowskian expansion =

Approximation technique in general relativity

Post-minkowskian vs Post-newtonian expansions

In physics, precisely in the general theory of relativity, post-Minkowskian expansions (PM) or post-Minkowskian approximations are mathematical methods used to find approximate solutions of Einstein's equations by means of a power series development of the metric tensor.

Unlike post-Newtonian expansions (PN), in which the series development is based on a combination of powers of the velocity $v$ (which must be negligible compared to that of light $c$) and the gravitational constant $G$, in the post-Minkowskian case the developments are based only on the gravitational constant, allowing analysis even at velocities close to that of light (relativistic).

| | 0PN | | 1PN | | 2PN | | 3PN | | 4PN | | 5PN | | 6PN | | 7PN | | | |
| 1PM | ( 1 | + | $v^2$ | + | $v^4$ | + | $v^6$ | + | $v^8$ | + | $v^{10}$ | + | $v^{12}$ | + | $v^{14}$ | + | ...) | $G^1$ |
| 2PM | | | ( 1 | + | $v^2$ | + | $v^4$ | + | $v^6$ | + | $v^8$ | + | $v^{10}$ | + | $v^{12}$ | + | ...) | $G^2$ |
| 3PM | | | | | ( 1 | + | $v^2$ | + | $v^4$ | + | $v^6$ | + | $v^8$ | + | $v^{10}$ | + | ...) | $G^3$ |
| 4PM | | | | | | | ( 1 | + | $v^2$ | + | $v^4$ | + | $v^6$ | + | $v^8$ | + | ...) | $G^4$ |
| 5PM | | | | | | | | | ( 1 | + | $v^2$ | + | $v^4$ | + | $v^6$ | + | ...) | $G^5$ |
| 6PM | | | | | | | | | | | ( 1 | + | $v^2$ | + | $v^4$ | + | ...) | $G^6$ |
Comparison table of powers used for PN and PM approximations in the case of two non-rotating bodies. 0PN corresponds to the case of Newton's theory of gravitation. 0PM (not shown) corresponds to the Minkowski flat space.

One of the earliest works on this method of resolution is that of Bruno Bertotti, published in Nuovo Cimento in 1956.

== See also ==
- Effective one-body formalism
