= Reinhard Meinel =

- Born: 21 October 1958 (age 67); Jena, Germany
- Citizenship: German
- Education: Friedrich Schiller University of Jena
- Known for: Analytic solution of the rigidly rotating disk of dust in GR
- Scientific career
- Fields: Physicist
- Workplaces: Friedrich Schiller University of Jena, ZMDI, Helmholtz-Zentrum Dresden-Rossendorf, Leibniz Institute for Astrophysics Potsdam

Reinhard Meinel (born 21 October 1958, in Jena) is a German physicist. From 1999 to 2025 he was the Head of the Relativistic Astrophysics group at the Institute of Theoretical Physics in Jena, Germany. In 1993 he published together with Gernot Neugebauer a complete analytical solution to the field equations of Albert Einstein's Theory of gravity in the case of a rigidly rotating disk of dust. He is internationally recognized as being one of the leading experts on the field of analytical gravity, and listed as a major contributor to general relativity.

== Education and career ==
He graduated in Physics at the University of Jena and obtained his Diploma (1981) and his Ph.D. (1984) in physics there. After working at the GDR Center for Research and Technology in Microelectronics (now the ZMDI semiconductor company) and the Institute for Nuclear Research (now Helmholtz-Zentrum) in Dresden and the Institute for Astrophysics (now Leibniz Institute for Astrophysics Potsdam) in Potsdam, he returned to the University of Jena where he was appointed extraordinary Professor in 1999. In 1989, he signed the "Aufbruch 89" [Initiative 89] founding proclamation of the New Forum which contributed to the fall of the GDR regime shortly after.

Professor Meinel is also actively engaged in teaching, and was awarded the Teaching Award of the Physics Faculty in Jena on 6 June 2007 for his course on Quantum Mechanics I.

== See also ==
- Friedrich Schiller University of Jena

== Sources ==
- https://www.physik.uni-jena.de/en/meinel.html
- https://journals.aps.org/prl/abstract/10.1103/PhysRevLett.75.3046
