= Alessandra Buonanno =

Italian-American physicist

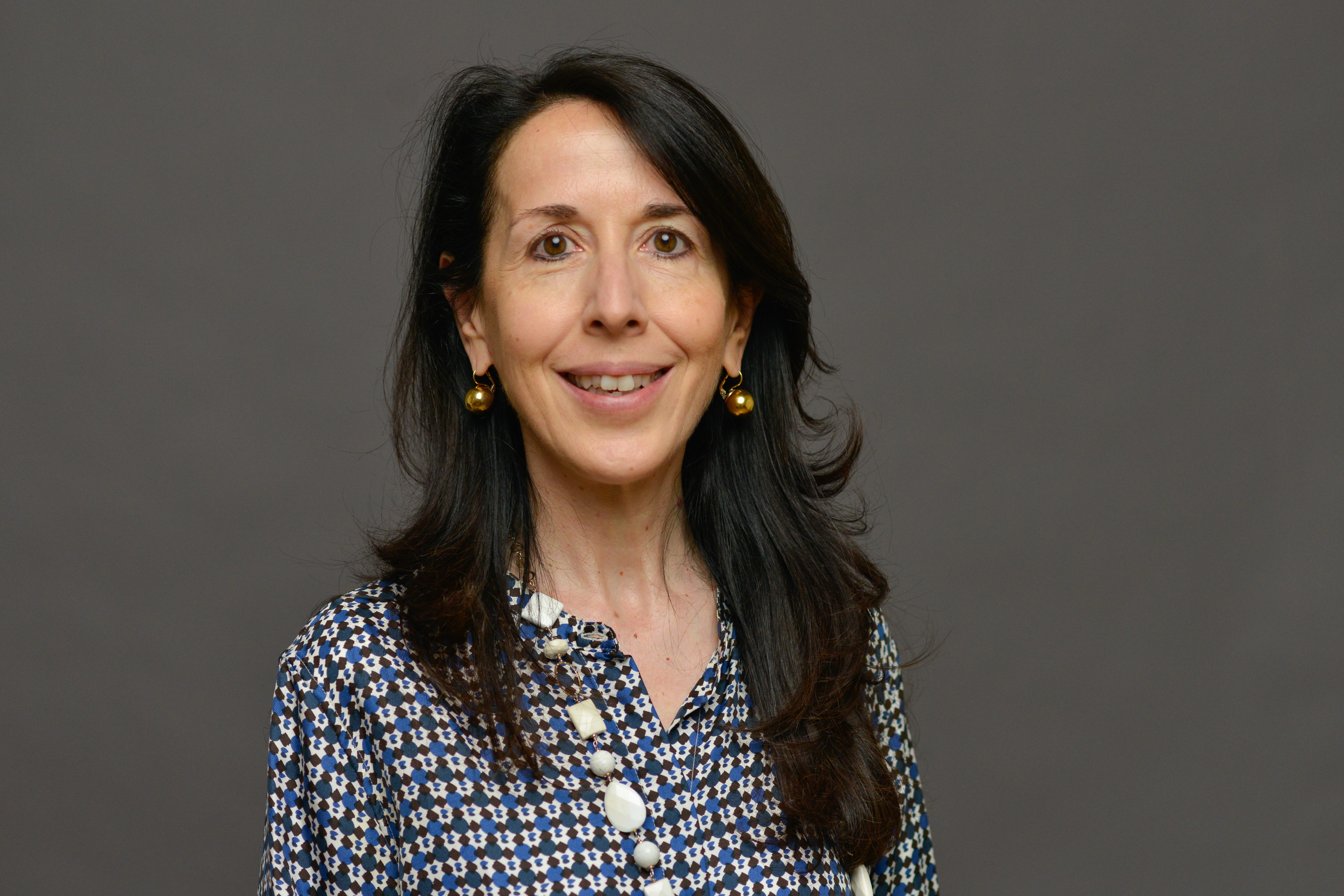
- Buonanno in 2022
- Born: 1968 (age 57–58); Cassino, Italy
- Education: University of Pisa
- Awards: Dirac Medal (2021); U.S. National Academy of Sciences (2021); German National Academy of Sciences Leopoldina (2021); Gottfried Wilhelm Leibniz Prize (2018)
- Scientific career
- Fields: Gravitational waves
- Workplaces: Max Planck Institute for Gravitational Physics (Albert Einstein Institute); University of Maryland, College Park; Astroparticle and Cosmology Laboratory, Paris; Institut d'Astrophysique de Paris
- Website: www.aei.mpg.de/alessandra-buonanno

Alessandra Buonanno (born 1968) is an Italian-American theoretical physicist and director at the Max Planck Institute for Gravitational Physics (Albert Einstein Institute) in Potsdam. She is the head of the "Astrophysical and Cosmological Relativity" department. She holds a research professorship at the University of Maryland, College Park, and honorary professorships at the Humboldt University in Berlin, and the University of Potsdam. She is a leading member of the LIGO Scientific Collaboration, which observed gravitational waves from a binary black-hole merger in 2015.

== Early life and education ==
Buonanno earned her MSc in 1993, and she completed her PhD in theoretical physics at the University of Pisa in 1996. After a brief period spent at the theory division of CERN, she held a postdoctoral position at the Institut des Hautes Etudes Scientifiques (IHES) in France and the R.C. Tolman Prize Fellowship at the California Institute of Technology.

== Career and research ==
Buonanno became a permanent researcher (Chargée de 1ere classe, CR1) in 2001 at the Institut d'Astrophysique de Paris (IAP) and then at the Astroparticle and Cosmology Laboratory (APC) in Paris with the Centre National de la Recherche Scientifique (CNRS) before joining the University of Maryland as a physics professor in 2005. She moved to the Max Planck Institute for Gravitational Physics in 2014.

Buonanno was a Kavli Fellow at the Kavli Frontiers of Science Japanese-American Symposium of the National Academy of Sciences in 2007. She was the William and Flora Hewlett Fellow at the Radcliffe Institute for Advanced Study at Harvard University, from 2011 to 2012. She was a Distinguished Visiting Research Chair at the Perimeter Institute from 2014 to 2020.

Buonanno's work with Thibault Damour of reducing the two-body problem in general relativity to an effective one-body formalism, and her research at the intersection of analytical-relativity modeling and numerical relativity simulations were employed to observe gravitational waves from merging binary black holes for the first time, and infer their astrophysical and cosmological properties. Beyond her core expertise in modeling gravitational waves from compact-object binary systems, Buonanno, in collaboration with Yanbei Chen, computed the quantum-optical noise in the advanced-LIGO gravitational-wave detectors, and showed that quantum correlations between photon shot noise and radiation-pressure noise (i.e., the optical-spring effect) can circumvent constraints imposed by the Heisenberg uncertainty principle in those detectors.

== Awards and honors ==
- 2023: Buonanno received the Oskar Klein Medal by Stockholm University and the Nobel Committee of the Royal Swedish Academy of Sciences and gave the Oskar Klein Memorial Lecture
- 2023: Elected Member of the Accademia Nazionale dei Lincei (Italian National Academy of Sciences)
- 2022: Tomalla Prize for her "outstanding work on gravitational-wave physics"
- 2021: Balzan Prize in the subject area "Gravitation: physical and astrophysical aspects" (shared with Thibault Damour)
- 2021: Dirac Medal and Prize of the Abdus Salam International Centre for Theoretical Physics (ICTP) (shared with T. Damour, F. Pretorious and S. Teukolsky)
- 2021: Elected Member of the U.S. National Academy of Sciences
- 2021: Elected Member of the German National Academy of Sciences Leopoldina
- 2021: Elected Member of the Berlin-Brandenburg Academy of Sciences and Humanities
- 2021: Galileo Galilei Medal of the Istituto Nazionale di Fisica Nucleare (INFN) (shared with T. Damour and F. Pretorious)
- 2019: 8th Benjamin Lee Professorship, Asian Pacific Center for Theoretical Physics, South Korea
- 2018: Gottfried Wilhelm Leibniz Prize of the Deutsche Forschungsgemeinschaft (DFG)
- 2016: Lower Saxony State Prize (shared with Bruce Allen and Karsten Danzmann)
- 2011: Elected Fellow of the American Physical Society (APS)
- 2010: Elected Fellow of the International Society on General Relativity and Gravitation (ISGRG)
- 2007: Richard A. Ferrell Distinguished Faculty Fellowship, University of Maryland, College Park
- 2006–2008: Alfred P. Sloan Research Fellowship
- 2000: Italian Society of General Relativity and Gravitational Physics (SIGRAV) Prize

=== Awards as member of the LIGO Scientific Collaboration ===
- 2017: Group Achievement Award of the Royal Astronomical Society (shared with the LIGO Scientific Collaboration)
- 2017: Einstein Medal of the Einstein Society in Bern, Switzerland (shared with the LIGO Scientific Collaboration and the Virgo Collaboration)
- 2017: Princess of Asturias Award for Technical and Scientific Research to R. Drever, K. Thorne and R. Weiss, and the LIGO Scientific Collaboration
- 2017: HEAD Bruno Rossi Prize of the American Astronomical Society (AAS) to G. Gonzalez and the LIGO Scientific Collaboration
- 2016: Special Breakthrough Prize in Fundamental Physics to R. Drever, K. Thorne and R. Weiss, and the LIGO Scientific Collaboration
- 2016: Gruber Cosmology Prize to R. Drever, K. Thorne and R. Weiss, and the LIGO Scientific Collaboration

== See also ==
- Gravitational Wave
- Post-Newtonian expansion
