= Chiara Mingarelli =

Italian-Canadian astrophysicist

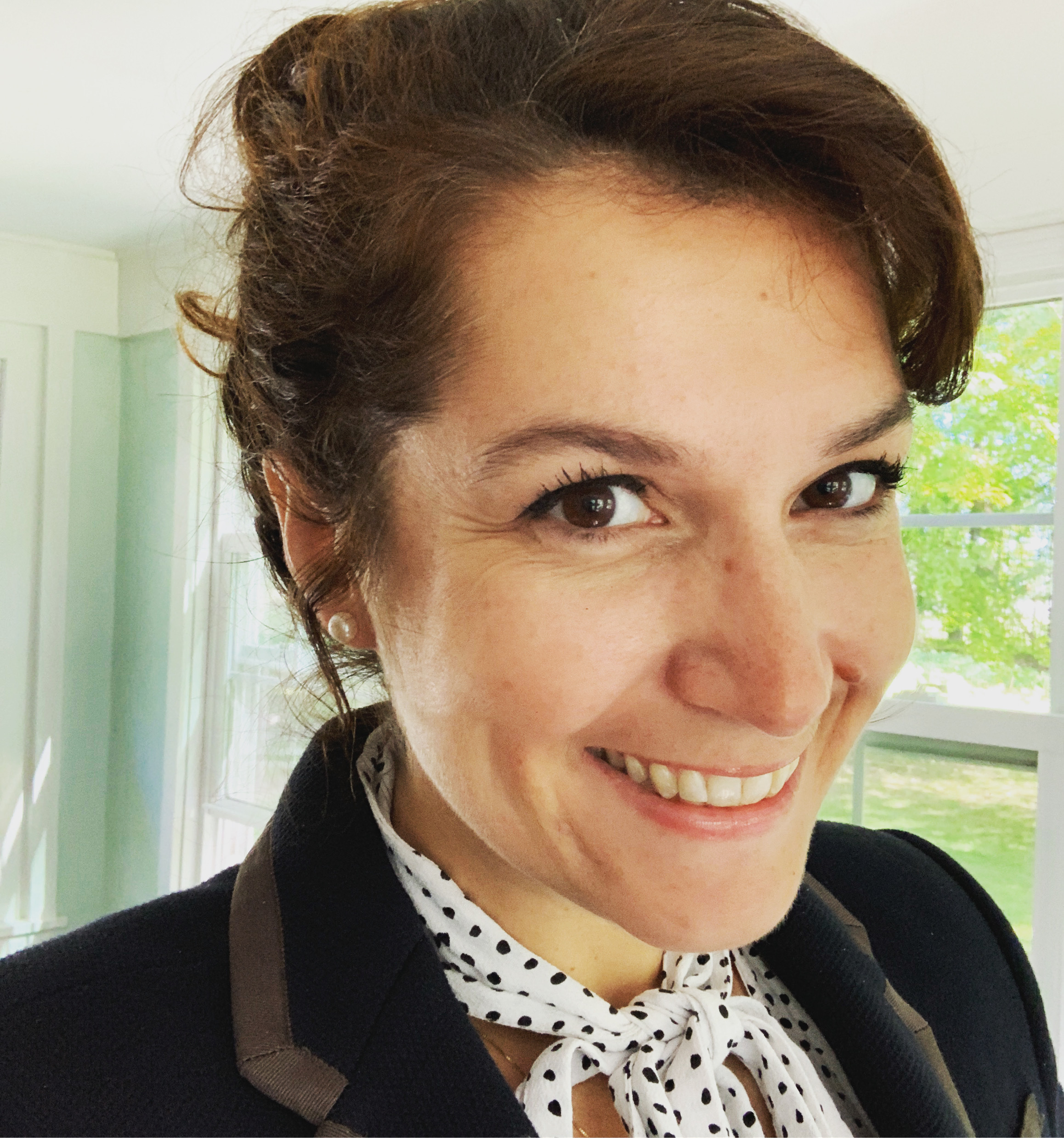
- In 2020
- Education: University of Birmingham; University of Bologna; Carleton University
- Known for: Gravitational wave astrophysics
- Scientific career
- Workplaces: Yale University; California Institute of Technology; Flatiron Institute; University of Connecticut
- Thesis: Gravitational wave astrophysics with pulsar timing arrays (2014)
- Website: www.chiaramingarelli.com

Chiara Mingarelli is an Italian-Canadian astrophysicist who researches gravitational waves. She was born around 1984 and is currently an Assistant Professor of Physics at Yale University since 2023, and previously an Assistant Professor at the University of Connecticut (2020–2023). She is also a science writer, communicator and a Fellow of Jonathan Edwards College.

== Education ==
Mingarelli grew up in Ottawa, Canada. She earned her bachelor's degree in mathematics and physics from Carleton University, Canada, in 2006. She earned her master's in Astrophysics from the University of Bologna in 2009. In 2014, she earned her PhD at the University of Birmingham with Alberto Vecchio

== Research ==
Mingarelli is a gravitational wave astrophysicist attempting to understand the merging of supermassive black holes. Mingarelli predicts the nanohertz gravitational wave signatures of such mergers. She will measure them using pulsar timing arrays, which can characterise the cosmic merger history of binary black hole systems. The systems emit nanohertz gravitational waves. After completing her PhD, Mingarelli was awarded a European Union Marie Curie International Fellowship, which she brought to the California Institute of Technology. There she continued to work on gravitational waves. Mingarelli spent the return phase of the Marie Curie Fellowship at the Max Planck Institute for Radio Astronomy. She is regularly an invited speaker at scientific conferences.

== Public engagements ==
Mingarelli appeared on Stargazing Live in 2012. She was featured on the BBC Radio Cambridgeshire show The Naked Scientists. In 2013 the Royal Astronomical Society selected Mingarelli as a Voice of the Future, and she attended an interview session at the House of Commons. She regularly appears on science themed podcasts and video series. She has been involved with Amy Poehler's Smart Girls, as a blogger and interviewee. She has contributed to popular science journals, including Scientific American, Nautilus Quarterly, and the New Scientist. Mingarelli maintains a social media presence on sites such as Twitter, where she is an advocate for "science, coffee and girl power".

== Awards ==
- Fellow, American Physical Society (2026)
- ICBS Frontiers of Science Award (2024)
- Marie Curie Alumni Career Award - 2023
- Early Career Prize, High Energy Astrophysics Division of the American Astronomical Society, 2023
- Springer Nature Award for "Scientific Achievement", 2022 Runner Up
- Amazon Web Services ML Award — October 2018
- Marie Curie International Outgoing Fellowship — 2014 - 2017
- Marie Curie Actions “Communicating Science” Prize — 2017
- Woman Physicist of the Month, November 2016
- Springer Thesis Award — 2015

== Publications ==
1. C. Xin, C. M. F. Mingarelli, J. S. Hazboun, Multimessenger pulsar timing arrayconstraints on supermassive black hole binaries traced by periodic light curves, submitted to ApJ, arXiv:2009.11865.
