= Contributors to the mathematical background for general relativity =

This is a list of contributors to the mathematical background for general relativity. For ease of readability, the contributions (in brackets) are unlinked but can be found in the contributors' article.

== B ==
- Luigi Bianchi (Bianchi identities, Bianchi groups, differential geometry)

== C ==
- Élie Cartan (curvature computation, early extensions of GTR, Cartan geometries)
- Elwin Bruno Christoffel (connections, tensor calculus, Riemannian geometry)
- Clarissa-Marie Claudel (Geometry of photon surfaces)

== D ==
- Tevian Dray (The Geometry of General Relativity)

== E ==
- Luther P. Eisenhart (semi-Riemannian geometries)
- Frank B. Estabrook (Wahlquist-Estabrook approach to solving PDEs; see also parent list)
- Leonhard Euler (Euler-Lagrange equation, from which the geodesic equation is obtained)

== G ==
- Carl Friedrich Gauss (curvature, theory of surfaces, intrinsic vs. extrinsic)

== K ==
- Martin Kruskal (inverse scattering transform; see also parent list)

== L ==
- Joseph Louis Lagrange (Lagrangian mechanics, Euler-Lagrange equation)
- Tullio Levi-Civita (tensor calculus, Riemannian geometry; see also parent list)
- André Lichnerowicz (tensor calculus, transformation groups)

== M ==
- Alexander Macfarlane (space analysis and Algebra of Physics)
- Jerrold E. Marsden (linear stability)

== N ==
- Isaac Newton (Newton's identities for characteristic of Einstein tensor)

== R ==
- Gregorio Ricci-Curbastro (Ricci tensor, differential geometry)
- Georg Bernhard Riemann (Riemannian geometry, Riemann curvature tensor)

== S ==
- Richard Schoen (Yamabe problem; see also parent list)
- Corrado Segre (Segre classification)

== W ==
- Hugo D. Wahlquist (Wahlquist-Estabrook algorithm; see also parent list)
- Hermann Weyl (Weyl tensor, gauge theories; see also parent list)
- Eugene P. Wigner (stabilizers in Lorentz group)

== See also ==
- Contributors to differential geometry
- Contributors to general relativity
