= Bruno Bertotti =

Italian physicist (1930–2018)

- Born: 24 December 1930; Mantua, Italy
- Died: 20 October 2018 (aged 87); Pavia, Italy
- Awards: Italian Gold Medal for Merit in Science and Culture (2007)

Academic background
- Education: University of Pavia
- Academic advisor: Erwin Schrödinger

Academic work
- Discipline: Theoretical physics
- Institutions: University of Pavia
- Notable students: Alberto Vecchio

Bruno Bertotti (24 December 1930 – 20 October 2018) was an Italian theoretical physicist, emeritus professor at the University of Pavia. He was one of the last students of Nobel prize winner Erwin Schrödinger.

Between 1953 and 1956, Bertotti worked as a scholar at the Dublin Institute for Advanced Studies, Ireland, where Schrödinger was director of the School of Theoretical Physics. In 1958-59, he was a visiting scholar at the Institute for Advanced Study in Princeton, United States. In 2007 he was awarded the Italian Gold Medal for Merit in Science and Culture. Among his former students is Italian physicist Alberto Vecchio.

== General relativity studies ==
Bertotti was known for his contributions to general relativity, in particular the Bertotti–Robinson electrovacuum, an exact solution of the Einstein field equation. He pioneered the post-Minkowskian expansion, and through the Cassini space research mission he obtained a more accurate measurement of the parameter gamma of the parameterized post-Newtonian formalism (PPN). The PPN gamma parameter measures the curvature of space in the metric theory of gravitation and it is equal to one in general relativity.

More recent studies revealed that the measured value of gamma is affected by gravitomagnetic effects caused by the orbital motion of the Sun around the barycenter of the Solar System. Bertotti postulated that the gravitomagnetic effect on Cassini had purely a general relativistic origin, but its theoretical value has never been tested in the experiment, which effectively makes the experimental uncertainty in the measured value of gamma larger (by a factor of 10) than that claimed by Bertotti.

== See also ==
- List of contributors to general relativity
- Timeline of gravitational physics and relativity
