= Virbhadra–Ellis lens equation =

Equation in mathematical physics

The Virbhadra-Ellis lens equation in astronomy and mathematics relates to the angular positions of an unlensed source $\left(\beta\right)$, the image $\left(\theta\right)$, the Einstein bending angle of light $(\hat{\alpha})$, and the angular diameter lens-source $\left(D_{ds}\right)$ and observer-source $\left(D_s\right)$ distances.

$$\tan \beta = \tan \theta - \frac{D_{ds}}{D_s} \left [\tan \theta + \tan \left (\hat{\alpha}-\theta\right ) \right ]$$.

This approximate lens equation is useful for studying the gravitational lens in gravitational fields of any strength when the angular source position is small.
