= Relativistic star =

Category of star

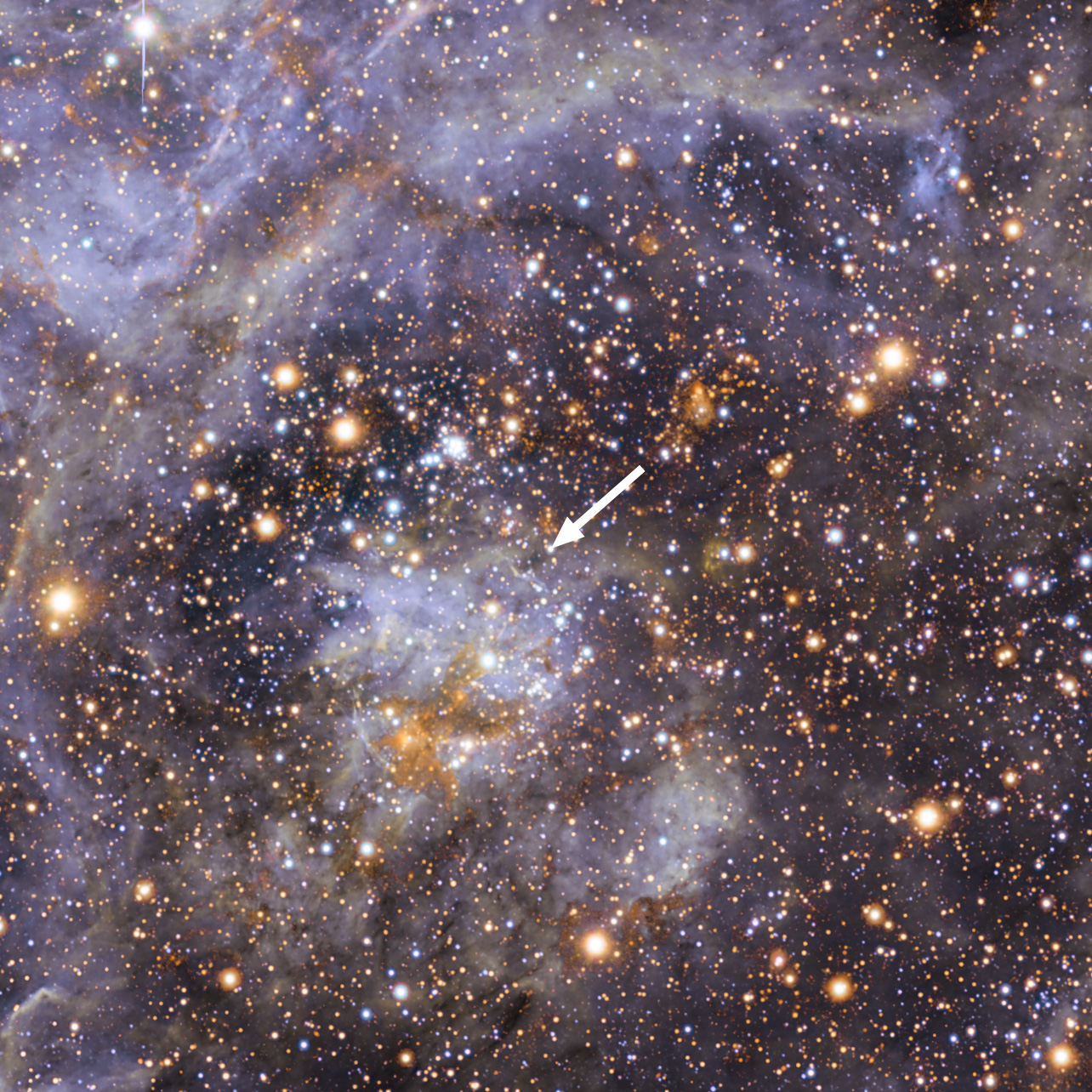
VFTS 102 is the most rapidly rotating star ever found - ~ 200 times faster than the sun, or with a speed of 447 kilometres per second (1,610,000 km/h)

A relativistic star is a rotating star whose behavior is well described by general relativity, but not by classical mechanics. The first such object to be identified was radio pulsars, which consist of rotating neutron stars. Rotating supermassive stars are a hypothetical form of a relativistic star. Relativistic stars are one possible source to allow gravitational waves to be studied.

Another definition of a relativistic star is one with the equation of state of a special relativistic gas. This can happen when the core of a massive main-sequence star becomes hot enough to generate electron-positron pairs. Stability analysis shows that such a star is only marginally bound, and is unstable to either collapse or explode. This instability is believed to limit the mass of main-sequence stars to a couple of hundred solar masses or so. Stars of this size and larger are able to directly collapse into a black hole of either intermediate or supermassive size.
