= Hans Stephani =

German physicist (1935–2003)

- Born: January 20, 1935; Brumby, Germany
- Died: September 14, 2003 (aged 68)
- Citizenship: German
- Known for: Exact solutions in general relativity
- Scientific career
- Fields: Theoretical physics
- Thesis: The structure of fields and equations of motion of charged gravitating point masses in the first and second (post-Newtonian) approximation (of Einstein’s theory) (1963)
- Doctoral advisor: Ernst Schmutzer

Hans Stephani (January 20, 1935 — September 14, 2003) was a German physicist who mainly worked on the general theory of relativity.

== Biography ==
Stephani obtained his master's degree at Jena in 1958 under the supervision of Gerhard Heber. He finished his PhD under Ernst Schmutzer at University of Jena and joined as a lecturer there. His wife Irmtraud Stephani is a mathematician at the same university. He retired in 2000.

== Books ==
- Hans Stephani, Dietrich Kramer, Malcolm MacCallum, Cornelius Hoenselaers, Eduard Herlt (2009). Exact Solutions of Einstein's Field Equations. Cambridge University Press.
- Hans Stephani, Malcolm MacCallum (1990). Differential Equations: Their Solution Using Symmetries. Cambridge University Press.
- Hans Stephani (2004). Relativity: An Introduction to Special and General Relativity. Cambridge University Press.
