= Niky Kamran =

Canadian mathematician

- Born: May 22, 1959 (age 67); Brussels, Belgium

Academic background
- Education: Université libre de Bruxelles (Lic); University of Waterloo (PhD)
- Thesis: Contributions to the Study of the Separation of Variables and Symmetry Operators for Relativistic Wave Equations on Curved Spacetime
- Doctoral advisor: Raymond McLenaghan and Robert Debever

Academic work
- Discipline: Mathematics
- Sub-discipline: Geometric analysis Mathematical physics Differential geometry
- Institutions: Institute for Advanced Study; McGill University

Niky Kamran FRSC (born May 22, 1959) is a Belgian and Canadian mathematician whose research concerns geometric analysis, differential geometry, and mathematical physics. He is a Distinguished James McGill Professor in the Department of Mathematics and Statistics at McGill University.

== Early life and education ==
Kamran was born in Brussels, Belgium. He earned a licentiate in mathematics from the Université libre de Bruxelles in 1980. He moved to Canada for graduate studies, earning a Ph.D. in 1984 from the University of Waterloo; his dissertation, titled Contributions to the Study of the Separation of Variables and Symmetry Operators for Relativistic Wave Equations on Curved Spacetime, was jointly supervised by Raymond G. McLenaghan and Robert Debever.

== Career ==
In 1986 he became an assistant professor at Waterloo but then, after spending a year as a member of the Institute for Advanced Study, Princeton, New Jersey, he moved to McGill in 1989. He was promoted to full professor in 1995, was awarded a James McGill Professorship in 2003 which he held until 2024, after which he was named Distinguished James McGill Professor as of 2024.

Kamran won the Aisenstadt Prize in 1992. He was elected a Fellow of the Royal Society of Canada in 2002 and was awarded a Killam Fellowship from 2006 to 2008. In 2012, he became one of the inaugural Fellows of the American Mathematical Society. In 2014, Kamran was the winner of the CRM-Fields-PIMS prize, and in 2019 he was elected a member of the Royal Academy of Science, Letters and Fine Arts of Belgium. That same academy had awarded him in 1988 the mathematics prize of its annual competition for a memoir on the equivalence problem of Élie Cartan and its applications.
