= Relativistic images =

Images of gravitational lensing

Animated simulation of gravitational lensing caused by a black hole going past a background galaxy

Relativistic images are images of gravitational lensing which result due to light deflections by angles $\hat{\alpha} > 3 \pi/2$.

This term was coined by Virbhadra and Ellis in the year 2000 and is used by many researchers working in this field (see also in [a], [b], and [c].) They further defined a term relativistic Einstein rings.

== Relativistic Einstein rings ==
Relativistic Einstein rings are ringed shaped images occurring due to light deflection $\hat{\alpha}>2 \pi$ when the light source, the lens (the deflector), and the observer are perfectly aligned.

Obviously, relativistic Einstein rings are relativistic images for the case when the source, lens, and observer are aligned. Relativistic images are very much demagnified and are extremely difficult to observe due to their poor magnifications as well as some additional problems.

== Effective deflection angle ==
Virbhadra and Ellis also defined a related term, the effective deflection angle of a relativistic image, which is defined as follows:

$\hat{\alpha}^{eff} = \hat{\alpha} - 2 n \pi$

where $\hat{\alpha}$ is the Einstein deflection angle. The positive integer $n$ stands for the number of turns a light ray makes around the lens. For primary and secondary images, $n = 0$.

== See also ==
- Exoplanet
- General relativity
