= Hans Adolf Buchdahl =

Australian physicist

- Born: 7 July 1919; Mainz, Germany
- Died: 7 January 2010 (aged 90); Adelaide, Australia
- Citizenship: German (1919–1945); Australian (1945–2010); German (1983–2010)
- Education: Imperial College London (BS); University of Tasmania (PhD)
- Known for: f(R) gravity, Buchdahl's theorem Thermodynamics; Optics
- Awards: Thomas Ranken Lyle Medal (1972)
- Scientific career
- Fields: Theoretical physics
- Workplaces: University of Tasmania (1941–1963); Australian National University (1963–1984)

Hans Adolf Buchdahl (7 July 1919 – 7 January 2010) was a German-born Australian physicist. He contributed to general relativity, thermodynamics and optics. He is particularly known for developing f(R) gravity and Buchdahl's theorem on the Schwarzschild's solution for the inside of a spherical star.

== Biography ==
Hans Adolf Buchdahl was born in Mainz, Germany, in a Jewish family (he used the spelling Adolph to dissociate himself from Hitler). His older brother Gerd Buchdahl was a well-known philosopher in science. In 1933, Gerd took Hans with him to England, to escape the Nazi government. At London, he completed a BSc and received the Associate of the Royal College of Science (ARCS) from Imperial College.

When World War II began, the UK government, unable to determine individual allegiance, interned German nationals including many Jewish refugees already fully assimilated. In July 1940, Hans came to Australia together with Gerd on board the HMT Dunera. He was detained initially at Hay in New South Wales, then at the Tatura centre in Victoria in May 1941. Once his mathematical abilities had been recognised there, he was released on a guarantor program and was transferred to the Physics Department of the University of Tasmania in Hobart. There he had to assist the overloaded teaching staff involved in wartime military research in optics. In 1949, he received his doctorate from the University of Tasmania. In 1956, he was awarded a D.Sc. from Imperial College London. From 1963 he was a professor and head of the Department of Theoretical Physics in the Faculty of Science at the Australian National University in Canberra until his retirement in 1984–1985.

He married Pamela Wann in 1950 and they had three children. He died in Adelaide, Australia, on 7 January 2010.

== Works ==
When working at the Waterworth Hobart Annexe, Buchdahl found the formulas for optical aberration coefficients taken to high orders that the Waterworth group used in designing imaging systems. These formulas were later applied worldwide, including in systems carried by satellites. At the same time, he also continued research in general relativity and classical thermodynamics.

His first interest in thermodynamics focused on fitting Carathéodory's axiomatic formulation better to a physicist's intuition. Buchdahl's attempt at making the foundations of thermodynamics more concise was far from advertising the use of the axiomatic method; instead it was an endeavour allowing "physical intuition to take precedence over mathematical niceties".

Buchdahl's interest in tensor and spinor analysis was related to dealing with formalisms and calculational procedures, be it spherical and spheroidal harmonics. While working with Weyl's theory and quadratic Lagrangians, he decided to present the Euler–Lagrange derivative of the most general Lagrangian built from the metric, the curvature tensor and its derivatives to arbitrary order. However, he did not use spinors as an important tool in general relativity, e.g., for the study of gravitational radiation and null infinity.

In gravitational theory, Buchdahl's contribution on the Einstein field equation or scalar-tensor theory are almost as well known as his spherically symmetric solutions describing the interior of stars. From his work on higher-order Lagrangians he concluded that theories with quadratic Lagrangians or f(R)-theories are unphysical.

When Einstein was still alive, as with many other theorists Hans Buchdahl could not escape the lure of the famous scientist's "unified field theory" of gravitation and electricity. However, as Buchdahl's papers in this field show, he was attracted by the enlarged constructive possibilities of the more general geometries, not by any hoped-for physics behind the theory. As shown in his "17 simple lectures", his understanding of general relativity made him clearly stay away from and criticise the parlance of the mainstream following J. A. Wheeler when speaking of "mass-energy curving space", "black hole" (in place of the physically more appealing "occluded star", or "frozen star") and, in the frame of quantum gravity, of "foamlike 3-geometry".

He was honoured by grants, prizes, medals, and memberships, to list some of them: Fellow of the Australian Academy of Science (1968), Thomas Ranken Lyle Medal (1972), Member of the American Optical Society (1974), Overseas Fellow of Churchill College, Cambridge (1979), Walter Burfitt Medal (Roy. Soc. NSW) (1980), C. E. K. Mees Medal (Opt. Soc. Amer.) (1993), A. E. Conrady Award (Int. Soc. Opt. Eng.) (1997).

== Publications ==
=== Books ===
- Buchdahl, H. A. (1988). Optical Aberration Coefficients. Peter Smith Pub Inc. ISBN 0844617601.
- Buchdahl, H. A. (1966). The Concepts of Classical Thermodynamics (1st ed.). Cambridge University Press. ISBN 0521115191.
- Buchdahl, H. A. (1993). An Introduction to Hamiltonian Optics. Courier Dover Publications. ISBN 978-0-486-67597-8.
- Buchdahl, H. A. (1976). Twenty Lectures on Thermodynamics. Pergamon Press. ISBN 0080182992.
- Buchdahl, H. A. (1981). Seventeen Simple Lectures on General Relativity (1st ed.). John Wiley & Sons. ISBN 0471096849.

=== Selected papers ===
- Buchdahl, H. A. (1970). "Non-linear Lagrangians and cosmological theory". Monthly Notices of the Royal Astronomical Society. 150: 1–8. Bibcode:1970MNRAS.150....1B. doi:10.1093/mnras/150.1.1.
- Buchdahl, H. A. (1959). "General Relativistic Fluid Spheres". Physical Review. 116 (4): 1027–1034. Bibcode:1959PhRv..116.1027B. doi:10.1103/PhysRev.116.1027. ISSN 0031-899X.
