= Raymond McLenaghan =

Canadian theoretical physicist and mathematician

- Born: 14 April 1939 (age 87)
- Education: University of Cambridge
- Known for: Carminati–McLenaghan invariants
- Scientific career
- Fields: Mathematics
- Doctoral advisor: Fred Hoyle; Dennis Sciama
- Doctoral students: Niky Kamran

Raymond George McLenaghan (born 14 April 1939) is a Canadian theoretical physicist and mathematician. With Carminati, he is known for Carminati–McLenaghan invariants.
