= Eric Poisson =

Canadian physicist (b. 1965)

- Born: July 26, 1965 (age 61); Montreal, Quebec, Canada
- Education: Laval University; University of Alberta
- Awards: Herzberg Medal (2005)
- Scientific career
- Fields: Gravitational physics
- Workplaces: University of Guelph; Perimeter Institute for Theoretical Physics
- Doctoral advisor: Werner Israel

Eric Poisson (born July 26, 1965) is a Canadian physicist studying black holes. He is a professor at the University of Guelph and a member of the Perimeter Institute for Theoretical Physics, in Waterloo, Ontario, Canada.

== Education ==
He was born in Montreal, Quebec, and grew up in Rimouski and Quebec City. He obtained his bachelor's degree from Laval University in Quebec City, and his Ph.D. at the University of Alberta, in 1991 under the supervision of Werner Israel.

== Research ==
Poisson's doctoral dissertation was on the concept of mass inflation (not to be confused with cosmological inflation), which he pioneered with Israel. Prior to the understanding of mass inflation, it was believed that wormholes into other universes would be found inside some black holes. Mass inflation closes off these wormholes in realistic black holes.

After completing his doctorate, Poisson spent three years as a postdoctoral fellow in the research group led by Kip Thorne at the California Institute of Technology, in Pasadena. During this period, he became interested in the gravitational-wave signatures that black hole systems might produce. Such signatures are crucial for the operation of gravitational-wave detectors such as LIGO. This work continued for a subsequent year spent with Clifford Will at Washington University in St. Louis.

His research now focuses on gravitational self-force, which is the force on a body moving through a gravitational field arising from the mass and energy of the body itself. This self-force is expected to play a crucial role in understanding the motion of a stellar mass black hole orbiting and eventually spiraling into a supermassive black hole such as those that reside at the centers of galaxies. These astronomical systems will be of special interest to space-based gravitational wave detectors such as Laser Interferometer Space Antennae when they are built, because they will allow precision measurements of the gravitational field of a black hole for the first time.

== Awards and honours ==
- Gerhard Herzberg Canada Gold Medal for Science and Engineering, the highest honor awarded by the Canadian Association of Physicists. (2005)
- Elected Fellow of the American Physical Society, for important contributions to the theory of gravitational radiation from compact bodies orbiting black holes, to the theory of back-reaction of the emitted radiation on their motions, and to understanding the implications for gravitational-wave detection. (2008)

== Books ==
- A Relativist's Toolkit, The Mathematics of Black-Hole Mechanics, Cambridge University Press (June 7, 2004). ISBN 978-0521830911.
- Gravity: Newtonian, Post-Newtonian, Relativistic (with Clifford M. Will), Cambridge University Press (May 31, 2014). ISBN 978-1107032866.
