= Effective one-body formalism =

Approach to the two-body problem in general relativity

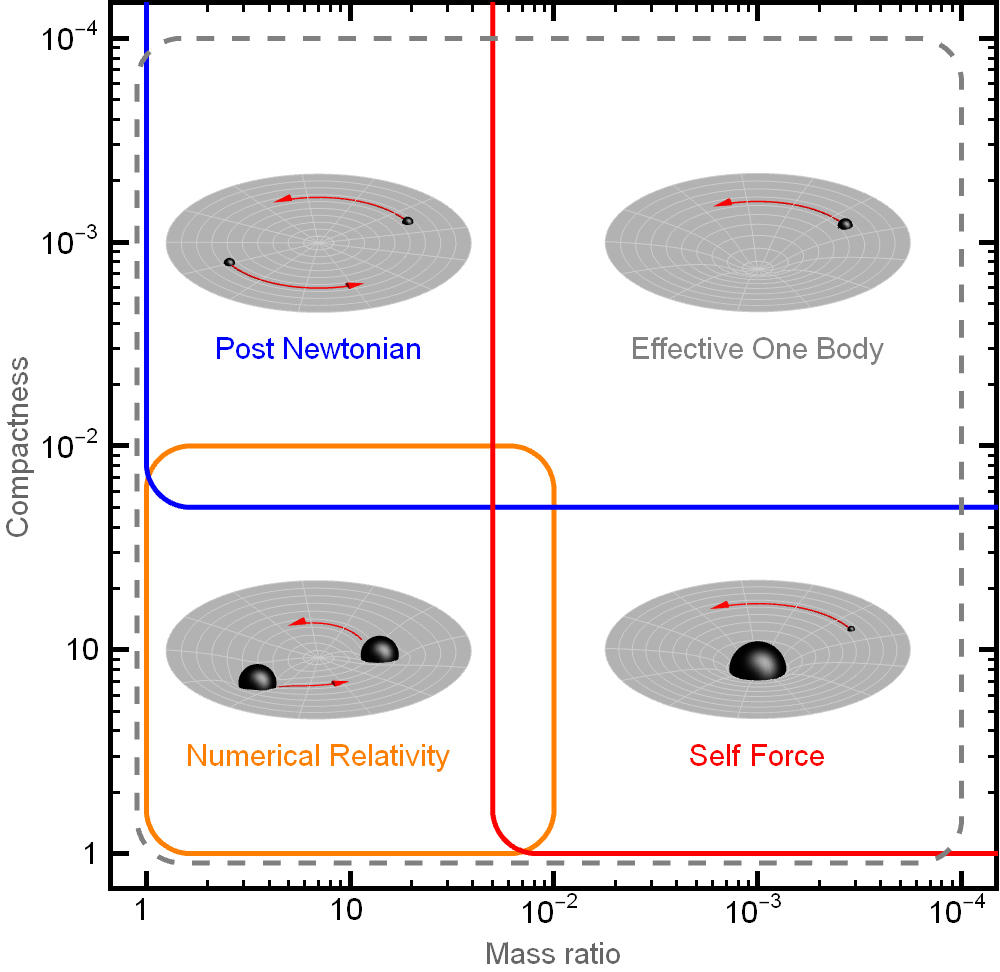
The effective one-body approach compared to other methods

The effective one-body or EOB approach is an analytical approach to the gravitational two-body problem in general relativity. It was introduced by Alessandra Buonanno and Thibault Damour in 1999. It aims to describe all different phases of the two-body dynamics in a single analytical method.

Classical gravity theory allows analytical calculations to be made in particular limits, such as post-Newtonian theory in the early inspiral, when the objects are at large separation, or black hole perturbation theory, when the two objects differ greatly in mass. In addition, they lead to results faster than numerical relativity.

Rather than being considered distinct from these independent approaches to the two-body problem, the EOB approach is a way to resum information from other independent methods. It does so by mapping the general two-body problem to that of a test particle in an effective metric. The EOB approach was used in the data analysis of gravitational wave detectors such as LIGO and Virgo.
