= Werner Israel =

Canadian physicist (1931–2022)

- Born: October 4, 1931; Berlin, Brandenburg, Prussia, Germany
- Died: May 18, 2022 (aged 90); Victoria, British Columbia, Canada
- Education: University of Cape Town, Trinity College Dublin
- Known for: Israel junction conditions, No hair theorem, equilibrium state of a black hole, internal structures of black holes
- Scientific career
- Fields: Gravitational physics
- Workplaces: University of Alberta, University of Victoria
- Thesis: Basic topics of the relativistic theory of shock waves (1959)
- Doctoral advisor: John Lighton Synge

Werner Israel OC FRSC FRS (October 4, 1931 – May 18, 2022) was a theoretical physicist known for his contributions to gravitational theory, and especially to the understanding of black holes.

== Biography ==
Israel was born in Berlin in 1931. His family fled Nazi Germany in 1936 and settled in Cape Town, South Africa, where he was raised. He was interested in astronomy and cosmology from a young age. For four years, when his parents were seriously ill, Israel and his brother lived in an orphanage. Israel received his B.Sc. and M.Sc. from the University of Cape Town, and his Ph.D. from Trinity College, Dublin, under the direction of John Synge. In 1958, Israel accepted a faculty position at the University of Alberta in Edmonton, where he remained as professor until his retirement in 1996. Following his retirement, Israel was Adjunct Professor of Physics and Astronomy at the University of Victoria in Victoria, British Columbia. He remained active in research for another two decades. During the Dublin years, Werner Israel met and married Inge Margulies. They had a son Mark and a daughter Pia.

== Scientific work ==
Werner Israel is primarily known for his work on general relativity, especially on black hole theory.

In 1966, relatively early in his career, Israel analyzed the dynamics of thin shells of matter in general relativity. Partly because many interesting examples can be constructed using such thin shells, this has become Israel's most cited paper, with thousands of citations. Interest in this paper has increased over time; it has been cited most heavily since the year 2000. Israel returned to the topic of thin shells in general relativity many years later.

Israel's first important contribution to black hole theory came in 1967 when he showed that the Schwarzschild solution, which describes a spherically symmetric, electrically neutral black hole, is the unique static black hole solution of Einstein's equations. Israel extended this result to Einstein-Maxwell theory, showing that in that case, the unique static black hole solution is the Reissner-Nordstrom solution. It was soon shown by Carter that similar statements hold for all time-dependent black hole solutions that are stationary (not necessarily static). These results have been summarized by the expression "a black hole has no hair." The hypothesis that gravitational collapse in the real world always leads to a Kerr-Newman black hole is sometimes called the Carter-Israel conjecture.

In 1972, Israel and G. A. Wilson discovered a new class of stationary solutions of Einstein-Maxwell theory, also discovered by Perjés. Variants of these solutions have been important in recent work counting quantum states of black holes in string theory models.

What was perhaps Israel's deepest work, published in 1976, concerned a black hole in equilibrium with the Hawking radiation that it emits. A quantum system in thermal equilibrium at a nonzero temperature is most directly described by a thermal density matrix. However, it is possible to "purify" such a thermal density matrix as a pure state of a doubled system—two copies of the original system. This pure state of a doubled system is nowadays usually called the thermofield double state. In view of Stephen Hawking's fundamental discovery of thermal radiation from black holes, a black hole at the quantum level is an example of a thermal system and one can ask how to describe a black hole in thermal equilibrium with radiation. Israel showed that the thermal equilibrium state of a (non-rotating) black hole has a natural geometric description in a two-sided "wormhole" version of the black hole spacetime. The two sides of the wormhole correspond to the two copies in the thermofield double state. This was in parallel with well known work by Hartle and Hawking and the state of a black hole in equilibrium with radiation is sometimes called the Hartle-Hawking-Israel state.

Standard formulations of dissipative thermodynamics are inconsistent with relativity theory as they predict instantaneous propagation of signals. In the 1970s, Israel reformulated dissipative thermodynamics to be consistent with relativity. As in the case of Israel's work on the thin shells, interest in this work has increased over time and Israel's papers in this area have been heavily cited since the year 2000.

In 1989, together with Eric Poisson, Israel pioneered the study of black hole interiors and, following up a suggestion of Roger Penrose, discovered the phenomenon of mass inflation, which can occur near the Cauchy horizon of a black hole. This work has a bearing on the question of “strong cosmic censorship'' in general relativity and influenced research on strong cosmic censorship in the following decades.

Together with Stephen Hawking, Werner Israel co-edited two volumes on gravitational physics. For the second of these, Three Hundred Years of Gravitation (1987) Hawking and Israel invited leaders in the field to contribute articles to commemorate the tricentennial anniversary of the publication of Sir Isaac Newton's Principia Mathematica (1687).

== Honors ==
- 1972: Fellow of the Royal Society of Canada
- 1974-75: Sherman-Fairchild Distinguished Scholar, CALTECH
- 1981: Medal of Achievement in Physics of Canadian Association of Physicists
- 1983: University of Alberta Research Prize in Natural Sciences and Engineering
- 1984: Izaak Walton Killam Memorial Prize
- 1986: Fellow of the Royal Society, London
- 1986-91: Senior Research Fellow at the Canadian Institute for Advanced Research
- 1994: Officer of the Order of Canada
