= Clifford Martin Will =

Canadian-born gravitational physicist

- Born: 1946 (age 79–80); Hamilton, Ontario
- Education: McMaster University (B.Sc.); California Institute of Technology (PhD)
- Known for: Post-Newtonian expansions
- Awards: Albert Einstein Medal (2019), Einstein Prize (2021)
- Scientific career
- Fields: General relativity
- Workplaces: University of Chicago (1972–1974); Stanford University (1974–1981); Washington University in St. Louis (1981–2012); University of Florida (2012–present)
- Thesis: Theoretical Frameworks for Testing Relativistic Gravity: Parametrized Post-Newtonian Formalism (1971)
- Academic advisors: Kip Thorne

Clifford Martin Will (born 1946) is a Canadian-born theoretical physicist noted for his contributions to general relativity.

== Life and work ==
Will was born in Hamilton, Ontario. In 1968, he earned a B.Sc. from McMaster University. At California Institute of Technology, he studied under Kip Thorne, earning his Ph.D. in 1971. He was an Enrico Fermi postdoctoral fellow under Subrahmanyan Chandrasekhar at the University of Chicago and an Assistant Professor at Stanford University, and in 1981 joined the faculty of Washington University in St. Louis. He served 10 years as Chair of Physics (1991 - 2002), and in 2005 was named James S. McDonnell Professor of Space Sciences. In 2012, he moved to a position as Distinguished Professor of Physics at the University of Florida.

Will's theoretical work has centered on post-Newtonian expansions of approximate solutions to the Einstein field equations, a notoriously difficult area which forms the theoretical underpinnings essential for such achievements as the indirect verification by Russell Hulse and Joseph Taylor in 1979 of the existence of gravitational radiation from observations of a binary pulsar, and the direct detection of gravitational radiation in 2015 by the LIGO-Virgo laser-interferometric detectors. He also made contributions to the theory of quasinormal modes of oscillation of black holes, to elucidating properties of the supermassive black hole at the center of the Milky Way, and to the "three-body problem" of Newtonian gravity.

Will's book reviewing experimental tests of general relativity is widely regarded as the essential resource for research in this area; his popular book on the same subject was listed by The New York Times as one of the 200 best books published in 1986, and was translated into French, German, Italian, Japanese, Portuguese, Spanish, Korean, Greek, Persian, and Chinese. Although the text is replete with experimental evidence for the theory of relativity, he does include the note:

In principle, a violation of general relativity could turn up at any level of accuracy, and if it did that would be extremely interesting (and, no doubt, controversial). But physicists generally prefer to find new ways to make measurements or to measure effects, rather than simply to repeat and refine the old experiments.

In 1986, the "Committee on Accuracy of Time Transfer in Satellite Systems", chaired by Will, validated the methods being used to incorporate the effects of general and special relativity in the operation of the Global Positioning System (GPS); without these corrections, the system would not function properly.

== Honors and awards ==
Will was a Guggenheim Fellow and a J. William Fulbright Fellow for the academic year 1996–1997. From 2009 to 2018, Will was the editor-in-chief of IOP Publishing's journal Classical and Quantum Gravity.

He was elected a Fellow of the American Physical Society in 1989 and elected to the American Academy of Arts and Sciences in 2002. He was elected to the National Academy of Sciences in 2007.

In 2019, Will received the Albert Einstein Medal, awarded each year since 1979 by the Albert Einstein Society in Bern, Switzerland, for his "important contributions to General Relativity, in particular including the Post-Newtonian expansions of approximate solutions of the Einstein field equations and their confrontation with experiments." In 2021 he shared the American Physical Society Einstein Prize with Saul Teukolsky, for "outstanding contributions to observational tests of general relativity with theories of gravitational waves, astrophysical black holes and neutron stars."

== Bibliographic information ==
According to the NASA ADS database, the h-index of Professor Will is 64.

== Selected works ==
- Will, Clifford M. (2014). "The Confrontation between General Relativity and Experiment". Living Reviews in Relativity. 17 (1): 4. arXiv:1403.7377. Bibcode:2014LRR....17....4W. doi:10.12942/lrr-2014-4. PMC 5255900. PMID 28179848. S2CID 15329710.
- Will, Clifford M. (1981). Theory and experiment in gravitational physics. Cambridge: Cambridge University Press. ISBN 0-521-23237-6.
- Will, Clifford M. (1993). Was Einstein right?: putting general relativity to the test. New York: Basic Books. ISBN 0-465-09086-9. (original publication date 1986)
- Will, Clifford M.; Poisson, Eric (2014). Gravity: Newtonian, Post-Newtonian, Relativistic. Cambridge University Press. ISBN 978-1107032866.
- Will, Clifford M. (2018). Theory and experiment in gravitational physics. 2nd Edition. Cambridge: Cambridge University Press. ISBN 978-1-107-11744-0.
- Will, Clifford M.; Yunes, Nicolás (2020). Is Einstein Still Right? Black holes, gravitational waves and the quest to verify Einstein's greatest creation. Oxford: Oxford University Press. ISBN 9780198842125.
