= Thibault Damour =

French physicist (b. 1951)

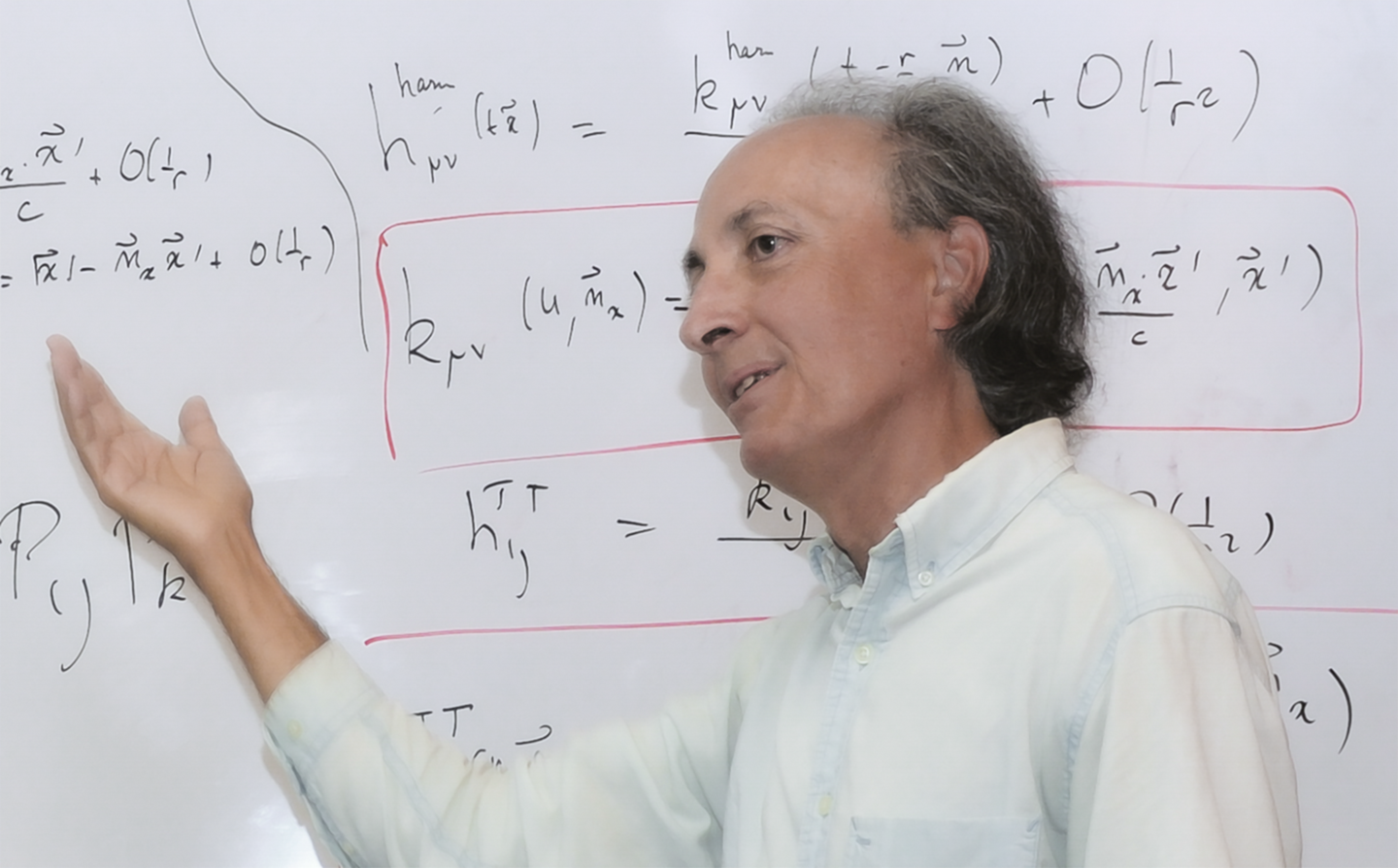
- Thibault Damour (2010)
- Born: 7 February 1951 (age 75); Lyon, France
- Education: École Normale Supérieure; Université Paris 6
- Known for: Effective one-body formalism
- Awards: Prix Paul Langevin (1984); Albert Einstein Medal (1996); Breakthrough Prize in Fundamental Physics (2016); CNRS Gold medal (2017); Dirac Medal of the ICTP (2021); Balzan Prize (2021)
- Scientific career
- Fields: Astronomy; General Relativity
- Workplaces: Observatoire de Paris; Institut des Hautes Études Scientifiques

Thibault Damour (French: [tibo damuʁ]; born 7 February 1951) is a French physicist.

He was a permanent professor in theoretical physics at the Institut des Hautes Études Scientifiques (IHÉS) from 1989 to 2022. Since then, he is professor emeritus.

An expert in general relativity, he has long taught this theory at the École Normale Supérieure (Ulm). He contributed greatly to the modelling of gravitational waves from compact binary systems, and with Alessandra Buonanno, he invented the "effective one-body" approach to representing the orbital trajectories of binary black holes.

In 2021 he was awarded, with Alessandra Buonanno, the Balzan Prize for Gravitation: physical and astrophysical aspects as well as the Galileo Galilei Medal and the Dirac Medal of the ICTP, both also shared with Frans Pretorius.
