= Curvature invariant (general relativity) =

Set of scalars in general relativity

In general relativity, curvature invariants are a set of scalars formed from the Riemann, Weyl and Ricci tensors – which represent curvature, hence the name – and possibly operations on them such as contraction, covariant differentiation and dualisation.

Certain invariants formed from these curvature tensors play an important role in classifying spacetimes. Invariants are actually less powerful for distinguishing locally non-isometric Lorentzian manifolds than they are for distinguishing Riemannian manifolds. This means that they are more limited in their applications than for manifolds endowed with a positive-definite metric tensor.

== Principal invariants ==
The principal invariants of the Riemann and Weyl tensors are certain quadratic polynomial invariants (i.e., sums of squares of components).

The principal invariants of the Riemann tensor of a four-dimensional Lorentzian manifold are

1. the Kretschmann scalar $K_1 = R_{abcd} \, R^{abcd}$
2. the Chern–Pontryagin scalar $K_2 = {{\star} R}_{abcd} \, R^{abcd}$
3. the Euler scalar $K_3 = {{\star} R^\star}_{abcd} \, R^{abcd}$

These are quadratic polynomial invariants (sums of squares of components). (Some authors define the Chern–Pontryagin scalar using the right dual instead of the left dual.)

The first of these was introduced by Erich Kretschmann. The second two names are somewhat anachronistic, but since the integrals of the last two are related to the instanton number and Euler characteristic respectively, they have some justification.

The principal invariants of the Weyl tensor are

1. $I_1 = C_{abcd} \, C^{abcd}$
2. $I_2 = {{\star} C}_{abcd} \, C^{abcd}$

(Because ${{\star} C^\star}_{abcd} = -C_{abcd}$, there is not a third independent third principal invariant for the Weyl tensor.)

=== Relation with Ricci decomposition ===
As one might expect from the Ricci decomposition of the Riemann tensor into the Weyl tensor plus a sum of fourth-rank tensors constructed from the second rank Ricci tensor and from the Ricci scalar, these two sets of invariants are related (in d=4):

$$K_1 = I_1 + 2 \, R_{ab} \, R^{ab} - \tfrac{1}{3} \, R^2$$
$$K_3 = -I_1 + 2 \, R_{ab} \, R^{ab} - \tfrac{2}{3} \, R^2$$

=== Relation with Bel decomposition ===
In four dimensions, the Bel decomposition of the Riemann tensor with respect to a timelike unit vector field $\vec{X}$ produces three components

1. the electrogravitic tensor $E[\vec{X}]_{ab} = R_{ambn} \, X^m \, X^n$
2. the magnetogravitic tensor $B[\vec{X}]_{ab} = {{\star} R}_{ambn} \, X^m \, X^n$
3. the topogravitic tensor $L[\vec{X}]_{ab} = {{\star} R^\star}_{ambn} \, X^m \, X^n$

=== Expression in Newman–Penrose formalism ===
In terms of the Weyl scalars in the Newman–Penrose formalism, the principal invariants of the Weyl tensor may be obtained by taking the real and imaginary parts of the expression

$$I_1 - i I_2 = 16 \left( 3 {\Psi_2}^2 + \Psi_0 \Psi_4 - 4 \Psi_1 \Psi_3 \right)$$

(note the minus sign)

The principal quadratic invariant of the Ricci tensor, $R_{ab} \, R^{ab}$, may be obtained as a more complicated expression involving the Ricci scalars (see the paper by Cherubini et al. cited below).

== Distinguishing Lorentzian manifolds ==
An important question related to curvature invariants is when the set of polynomial curvature invariants can be used to (locally) distinguish manifolds. To be able to do this is necessary to include higher-order invariants including derivatives of the Riemann tensor but in the Lorentzian case, it is known that there are spacetimes that cannot be distinguished; e.g., the VSI spacetimes for which all such curvature invariants vanish and thus cannot be distinguished from flat space. This failure of being able to distinguishing Lorentzian manifolds is related to the fact that the Lorentz group is non-compact.

There are still examples of cases when we can distinguish Lorentzian manifolds using their invariants. Examples of such are fully general Petrov type I spacetimes with no Killing vectors, see Coley et al. below. Indeed, it was here found that the spacetimes failing to be distinguished by their set of curvature invariants are all Kundt spacetimes.

== See also ==
- Bach tensor, for a sometimes useful tensor generated by $I_2$ via a variational principle
- Carminati–McLenaghan invariants, for a set of polynomial invariants of the Riemann tensor of a four-dimensional Lorentzian manifold that is known to be complete under some circumstances
- Curvature invariant, for curvature invariants in a more general context
