= GRTensorII =

Computer program for tensor computations

GRTensorII is a Maple package designed for tensor computations, particularly in general relativity.

This package was developed at Queen's University in Kingston, Ontario by Peter Musgrave, Denis Pollney and Kayll Lake. While there are many packages which perform tensor computations (including a standard Maple package), GRTensorII is particularly well suited for carrying out routine computations of useful quantities when working with (or searching for) exact solutions in general relativity. Its principal advantages include

- convenience of definition of new spacetimes and tensor expression
- efficient computation with frames
- efficient computation of Ricci and Weyl spinor components and of Petrov classification
- efficient computation of the Carminati-McLenaghan invariants and other curvature invariants

Currently, GRTensorII does have some drawbacks:

- Maple is expensive
- valuable subpackages for perturbation and junction computations have not been updated
- no subpackage is yet publicly available in GRTensorII for executing the Cartan-Karlhede algorithm
- sharing information with standard Maple packages can sometimes become awkward
