= Kretschmann scalar =

Quadratic scalar invariant

In the theory of Lorentzian manifolds, particularly in the context of applications to general relativity, the Kretschmann scalar is a quadratic scalar invariant. It was introduced by Erich Kretschmann.

== Definition ==
The Kretschmann invariant is

$$K =  R_{abcd} \, R^{abcd}$$

where $R^{a}{}_{bcd} = \partial_{c}\Gamma^{a}{}_{db} - \partial_{d}\Gamma^{a}{}_{cb} + \Gamma^{a}{}_{ce}\Gamma^{e}{}_{db} - \Gamma^{a}{}_{de}\Gamma^{e}{}_{cb}$ is the Riemann curvature tensor and $\Gamma$ is the Christoffel symbol. Because it is a sum of squares of tensor components, this is a quadratic invariant.

Einstein summation convention with raised and lowered indices is used above and throughout the article. An explicit summation expression is

$$K =  R_{abcd} \, R^{abcd} =\sum_{a =0}^{3}\sum_{b =0}^3 \sum_{c=0}^3\sum_{d=0}^3 R_{abcd} \, R^{abcd} \text{ with } R^{abcd} =\sum_{i=0}^3 g^{ai}\,\sum_{j=0}^3 g^{bj}\,\sum_{k=0}^3 g^{ck}\,\sum_{\ell=0}^3 g^{d\ell}\, R_{ijk\ell}. \,$$

=== Examples ===
For a Schwarzschild black hole of mass $M$, the Kretschmann scalar is

$$K = \frac{48 G^2 M^2}{c^4 r^6} \,.$$

where $G$ is the gravitational constant.

For a general FRW spacetime with metric

$$ds^2 = - \mathrm{d}t^2 + {a(t)}^2 \left(\frac{\mathrm{d}r^2}{1-k r^2} + r^2 \, \mathrm{d}\theta^2 + r^2 \sin^2 \theta \, \mathrm{d}\varphi^2 \right),$$

the Kretschmann scalar is

$$K=\frac{12 \left[a(t)^2 a''(t)^2+\left(k+a'(t)^2 \right)^2\right]}{a(t)^4}.$$

== Relation to other invariants ==
Another possible invariant (which has been employed for example in writing the gravitational term of the Lagrangian for some higher-order gravity theories) is

$$C_{abcd} \, C^{abcd}$$

where $C_{abcd}$ is the Weyl tensor, the conformal curvature tensor which is also the completely traceless part of the Riemann tensor. In $d$ dimensions this is related to the Kretschmann invariant by

$$R_{abcd} \, R^{abcd} = C_{abcd} \, C^{abcd} +\frac{4}{d-2} R_{ab}\, R^{ab} - \frac{2}{(d-1)(d-2)}R^2$$

where $R^{ab}$ is the Ricci curvature tensor and $R$ is the Ricci scalar curvature (obtained by taking successive traces of the Riemann tensor). The Ricci tensor vanishes in vacuum spacetimes (such as the Schwarzschild solution mentioned above), and hence there the Riemann tensor and the Weyl tensor coincide, as do their invariants.

=== Gauge theory invariants ===
The Kretschmann scalar and the Chern-Pontryagin scalar

$$R_{abcd} \, {{}^\star \! R}^{abcd}$$

where ${{}^\star R}^{abcd}$ is the left dual of the Riemann tensor, are mathematically analogous (to some extent, physically analogous) to the familiar invariants of the electromagnetic field tensor

$$F_{ab} \, F^{ab}, \; \; F_{ab} \, {{}^\star \! F}^{ab}.$$

Generalising from the $U(1)$ gauge theory of electromagnetism to general non-abelian gauge theory, the first of these invariants is

$$\text{Tr}(F_{ab} F^{ab})$$,

an expression proportional to the Yang–Mills Lagrangian. Here $F_{ab}$ is the curvature of a covariant derivative, and $\text{Tr}$ is a trace form. The Kretschmann scalar arises from taking the connection to be on the frame bundle.

== See also ==
- Carminati-McLenaghan invariants, for a set of invariants
- Classification of electromagnetic fields, for more about the invariants of the electromagnetic field tensor
- Curvature invariant, for curvature invariants in Riemannian and pseudo-Riemannian geometry in general
- Curvature invariant (general relativity)
- Ricci decomposition, for more about the Riemann and Weyl tensor
