= Kundt =

Kundt is a German language surname. It stems from a reduced form of the male given name Konrad – and may refer to:

- August Kundt (1839–1894), German physicist
- Hans Kundt (1869–1939), German military officer
- Marie Kundt (1870–1932), German photographer and educator
- Wolfgang Kundt (1931), German astrophysicist
