= Big Brake =

Scientific theory

The Big Brake is a theoretical scientific model suggested as one of the possibilities for the ultimate fate of the universe – a possible cosmological singularity. In this model, the effect of dark energy reverses, causing the expansion of the universe to decelerate at an infinite rate, ultimately coming to a halt.

== Soft singularities ==
In many singularities, such as the Big Rip, the Hubble parameter blows up, thus causing the scale factor and expansion rate of the universe to increase to infinity in a finite amount of time. This is due to the rise in the density of phantom dark energy, which accelerates the expansion of the universe in a feedback loop, causing the expansion to grow so intense that it overcomes all gravitational and physical bonds. This has catastrophic consequences, causing all the structures of the universe to be ripped apart, including atoms and nuclei, as each particle is now causally disconnected from all others.

The Big Brake model does not fall under the same category as such singularities. The Big Brake model falls under the category of cosmological singularities not connected with the divergence of the Hubble variable itself but of one of its higher derivatives. The Big Brake singularity occurs at finite values of the Hubble parameter, scale factor and vanishing energy density, but diverging deceleration and infinite pressure.

As the singularity occurs at a finite value of the Hubble parameter, while the first or higher derivatives of the Hubble parameter (in this case, the second derivative of the Hubble parameter and scale factor) are divergent, this implies the divergence of some curvature invariants.

These types of singularities are referred to as soft, quiescent, or sudden. They are referred to as so due to the fact that, as the expansion rate appears to remain finite, there is a chance that the universe and the existence of matter 'survives'. Though, the divergent derivates mean that this type of 'survivable' singularity is still considered a singularity in general relativity, nonetheless.

== Outcomes ==
As this singularity is a soft one, it is expected that it may be possible for geodesic observers, as well as strings, to cross the singularity. Following the singularity, the tachyonic universe may eventually recollapse in a Big Crunch.

It is also possible that matter may still exist after this soft singularity, though in a different form and organisation. Furthermore, cosmic matter may be subjected to extreme tidal forces and be destroyed. The consequences for space and time in these circumstances are also unclear.

== See also ==
- Big Bang
- Big Crunch
- Big Freeze
- Big Rip
