= Neustrelitz =

Town in Mecklenburg-Vorpommern, Germany

Neustrelitz Niegenstrelitz (Low German)
- Town
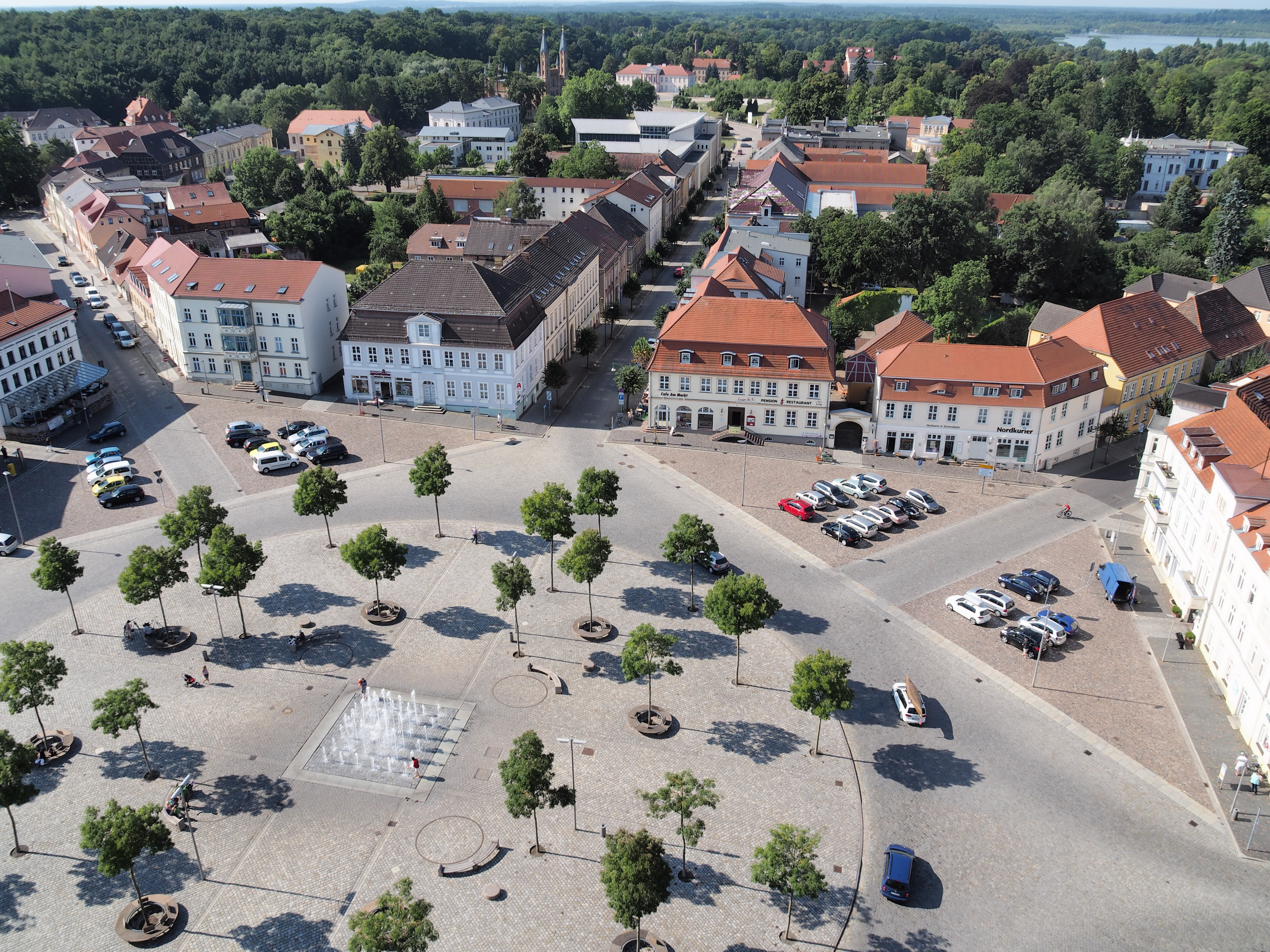
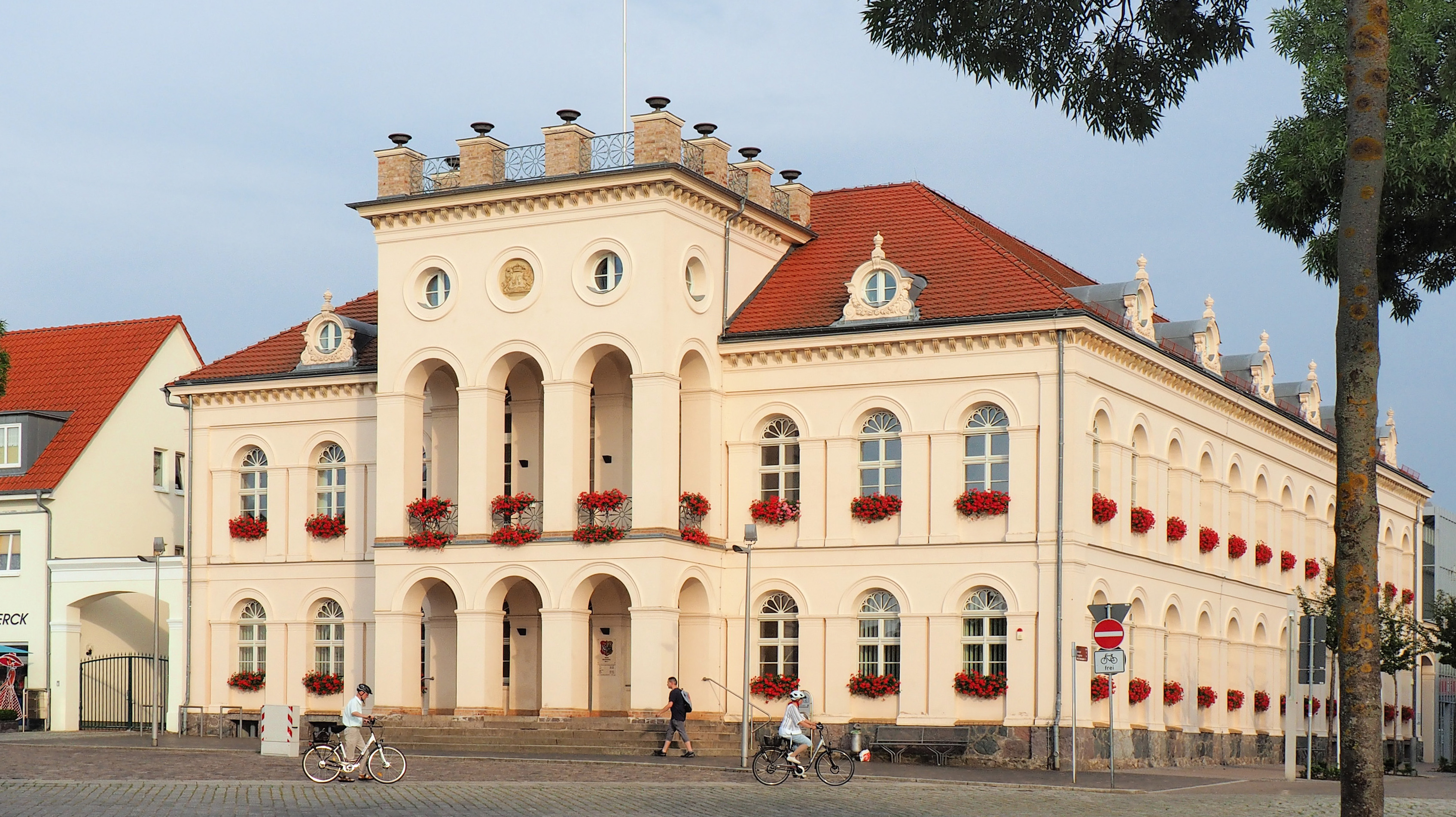
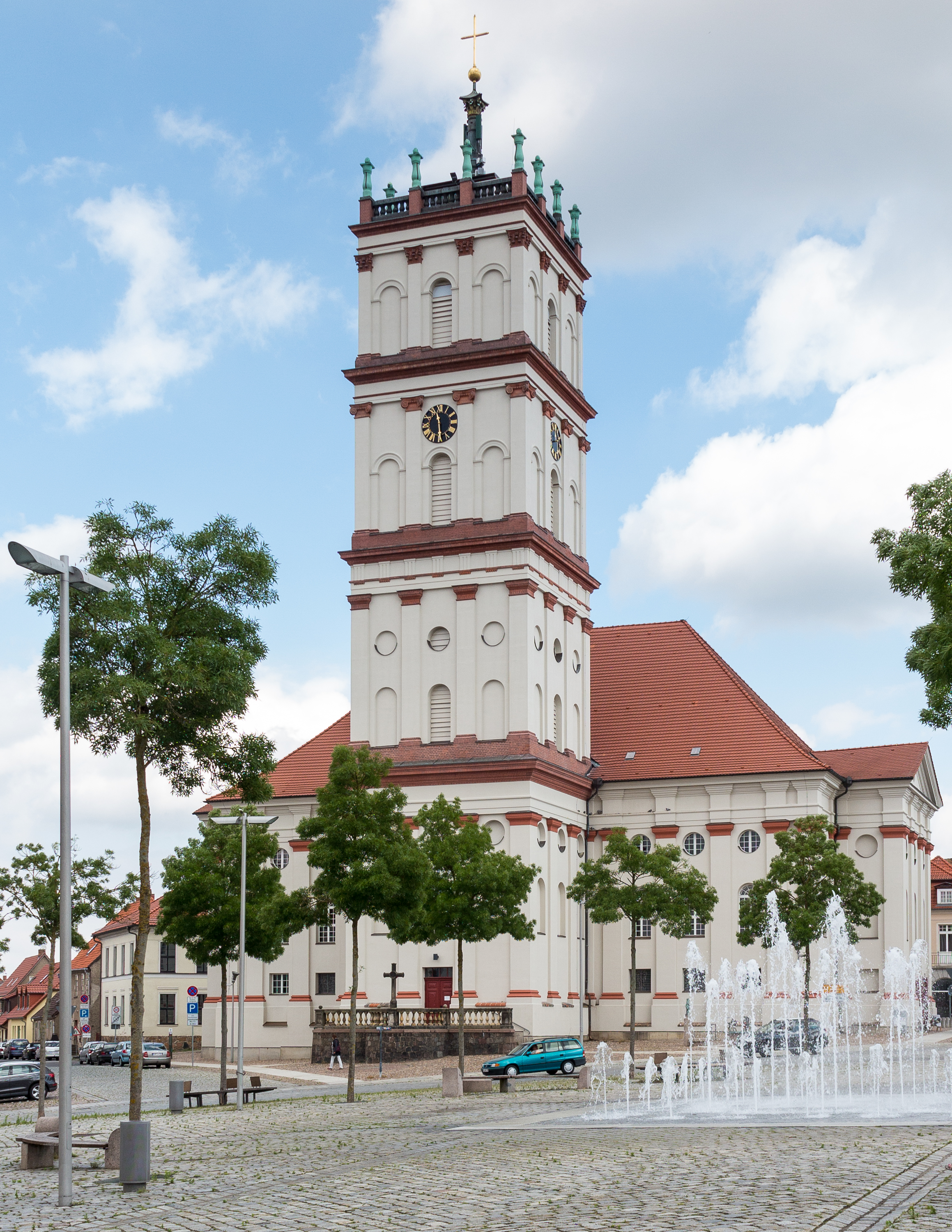
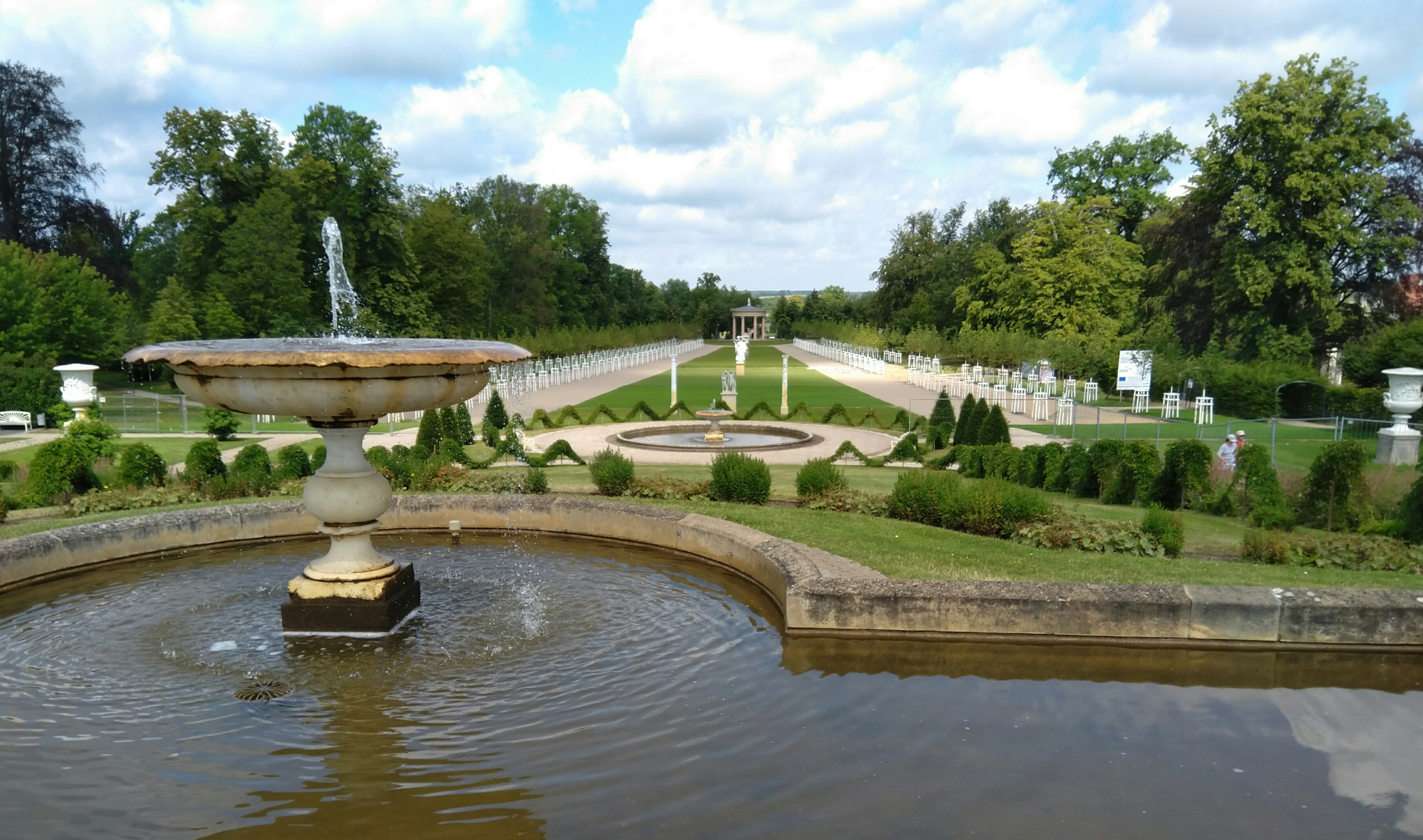
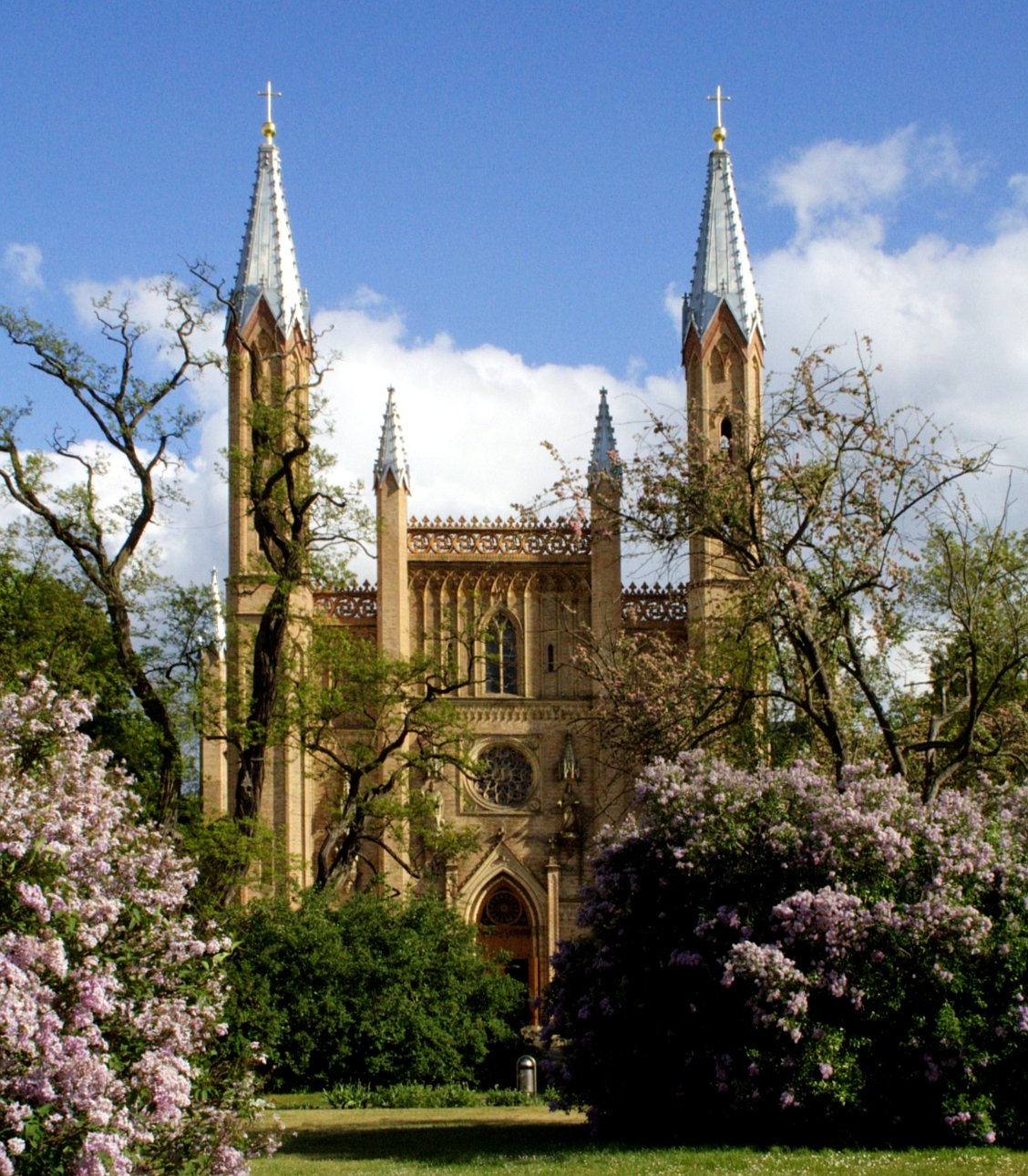
- Market Square Town Hall City Church Park of Neustrelitz Palace Castle Church

- Coat of arms

- Location of Neustrelitz within Mecklenburgische Seenplatte district
- Interactive map of Neustrelitz
- Location within Germany Location within Mecklenburg-Vorpommern
- Coordinates: 53°21′53″N 13°03′49″E
- Country: Germany
- State: Mecklenburg-Vorpommern
- District: Mecklenburgische Seenplatte
- Subdivisions: 13 districts

Government
  - Mayor: Andreas Grund

Area
  - Total: 139.86 km^{2} (54.00 sq mi)
- Elevation: 75 m (246 ft)

Population (2025-12-31)
  - Total: 20,136
  - Density: 143.97/km^{2} (372.89/sq mi)
- Time zone: UTC+01:00 (CET)
  - Summer (DST): UTC+02:00 (CEST)
- Postal codes: 17235
- Dialling codes: 03981
- Vehicle registration: MST
- Website: www.neustrelitz.de

Neustrelitz (German: [nɔʏˈʃtʁeːlɪts]; East Low German: Niegenstrelitz) is a town in the Mecklenburgische Seenplatte district in the state of Mecklenburg-Vorpommern, Germany. It is situated on the shore of the Zierker See in the Mecklenburg Lake District. From 1738 until 1918 it was the capital of the Duchy of Mecklenburg-Strelitz. From 1994 until 2011 it was the capital of the district of Mecklenburg-Strelitz.

The name Strelitz is derived from the Polabian word Strelci, meaning "archers" or "shooters" (cognate with Russian streltsy).

== History ==
The village of Strelitz was first mentioned in 1278. It grew to a small town in the following centuries. In the 17th century Strelitz was a part of the duchy of Mecklenburg-Güstrow, which ceased to exist after the death of the last duke in 1695. Afterwards the new Duchy of Mecklenburg-Strelitz was established (1701). This small duchy contained the present-day district and an exclave around Ratzeburg, which is today situated in Schleswig-Holstein.

In 1712 the castle and the town of Strelitz burnt down. After this disaster the duke and his family lived on their hunting lodge at the lake called Zierker See (Lake Zierke) to the northwest of Strelitz. Around this place the new town of Neustrelitz (New Strelitz) was constructed. It became the official capital of Mecklenburg-Strelitz in 1736.

Neustrelitz remained the ducal seat until 1918 and was the capital of the Free State of Mecklenburg-Strelitz from 1918 to 1933. In 1934 it was merged with Mecklenburg-Schwerin to the Gau of Mecklenburg.

The ancient town of Strelitz continued to exist after the fire of 1712. It was a small village, which was suburbanised by Neustrelitz in 1931.

Irma Grese was born in Neustrelitz and became a prominent women Waffen SS guard, famed for her good looks. When the Red Army troops of the 2nd Belorussian Front entered the town on 30 April 1945, 681 people committed suicide.

== Sights and monuments ==
The city centre is characterised by Baroque architecture. Its heart is the Marktplatz (Market Square), with the Stadtkirche (city church), built in 1768–1778 and the opposite Rathaus (Town Hall), built in 1841 by Friedrich W. Buttel, a disciple of Karl Friedrich Schinkel.

The Baroque Neustrelitz Palace was destroyed in 1945, but the palace gardens (Schloßgarten) still exist. The 18th-century Orangerie was initially used as a summerhouse, the Schloßkirche (Palace Church) is English Neo-Gothic style and was constructed between 1855 and 1859, the Neoclassic Hebe temple has a replica of a statue of the goddess Hebe, while the Louise Temple was built in 1891 in the shape of a Greek temple to house the tomb of Queen Louise of Prussia, born Princess of Mecklenburg-Strelitz.

The small lake Glambeck See is in a protected area, but there is a restaurant overlooking the lake.

== Nazi-era asylum ==
The Nazi asylum for the "mentally ill" was central in the mass murder of disabled humans. The Neustrelitz asylum was also used as a transit station for humans judged to be unfit. The building has fallen into disrepair. Since 2010 guided tours provide visitors with the opportunity to reflect on German history.

== Transport ==
The town has a station on the Berlin Northern Railway and provides direct connections to Berlin and Rostock.

== Gallery ==
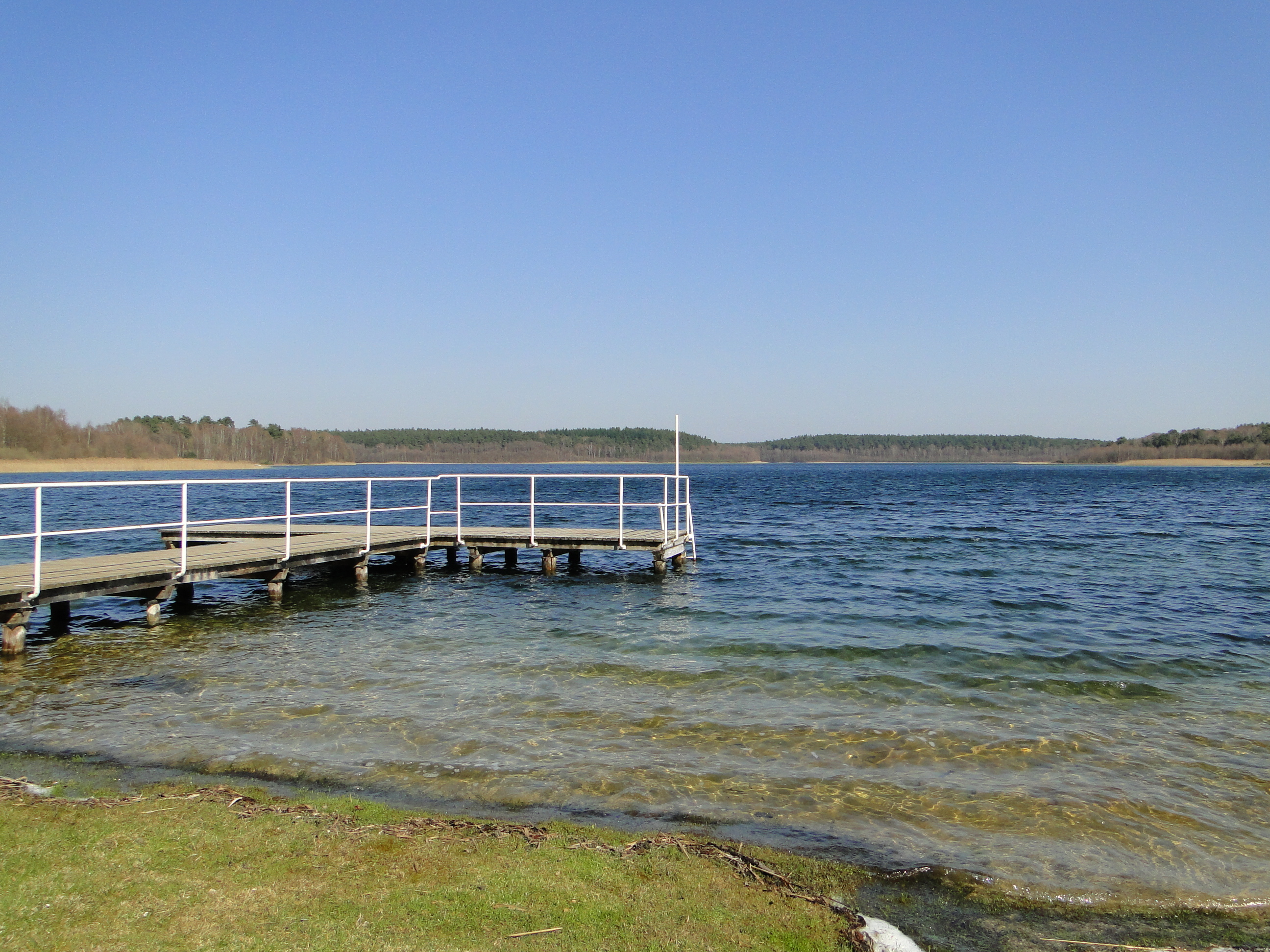
Lake Großer Fürstenseer

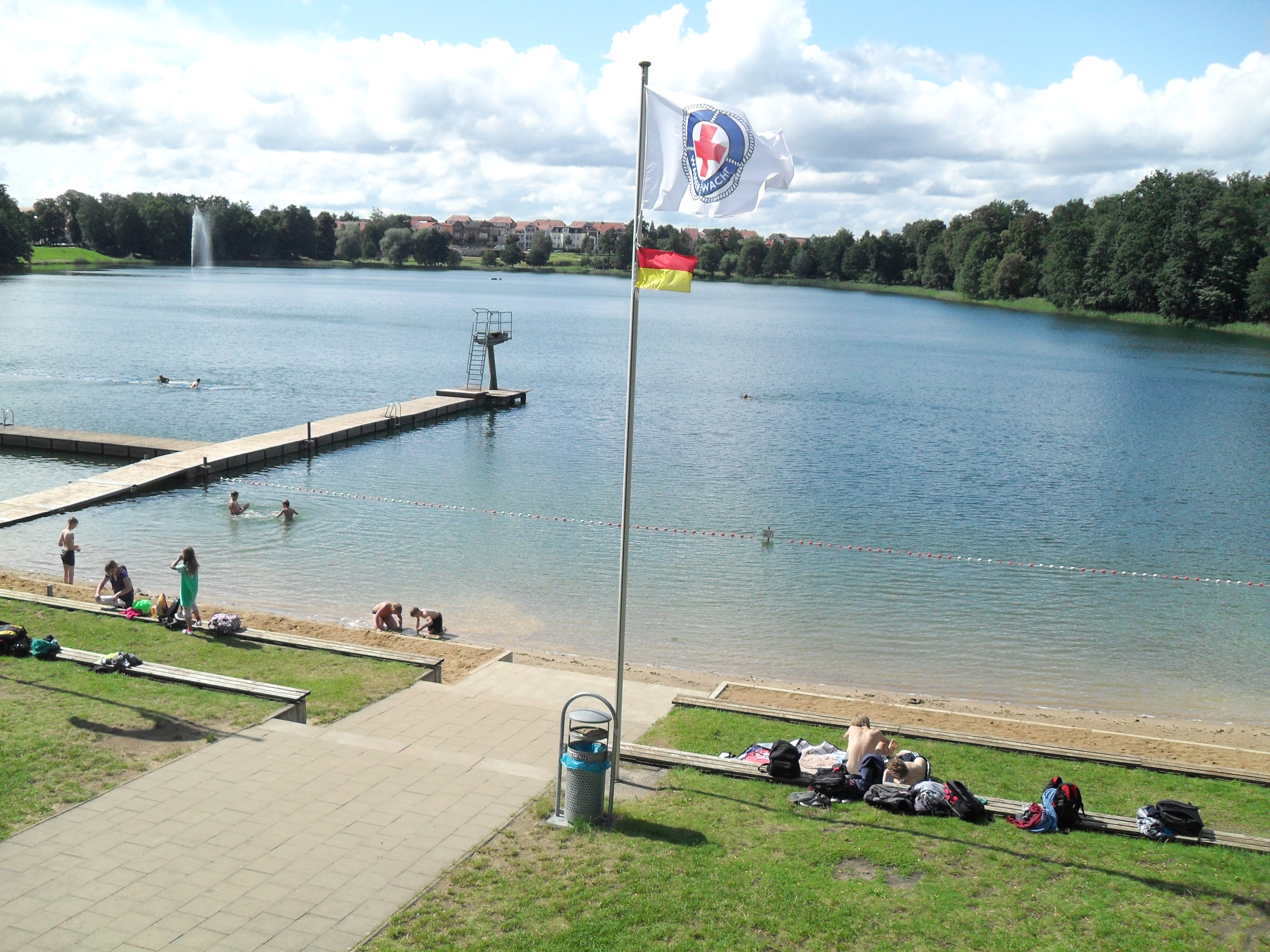
Lake Glambecker See

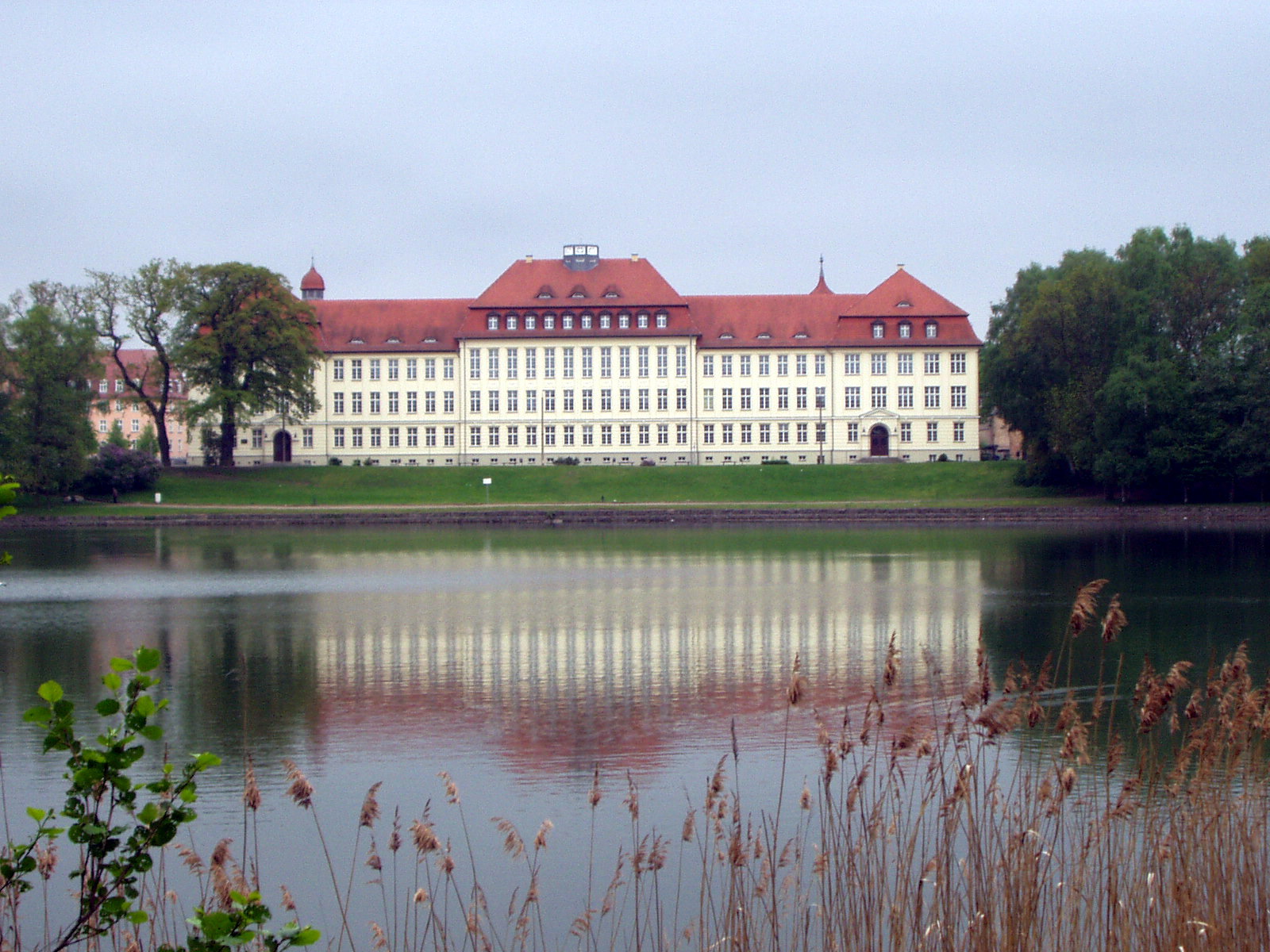
Gymnasium Carolinum

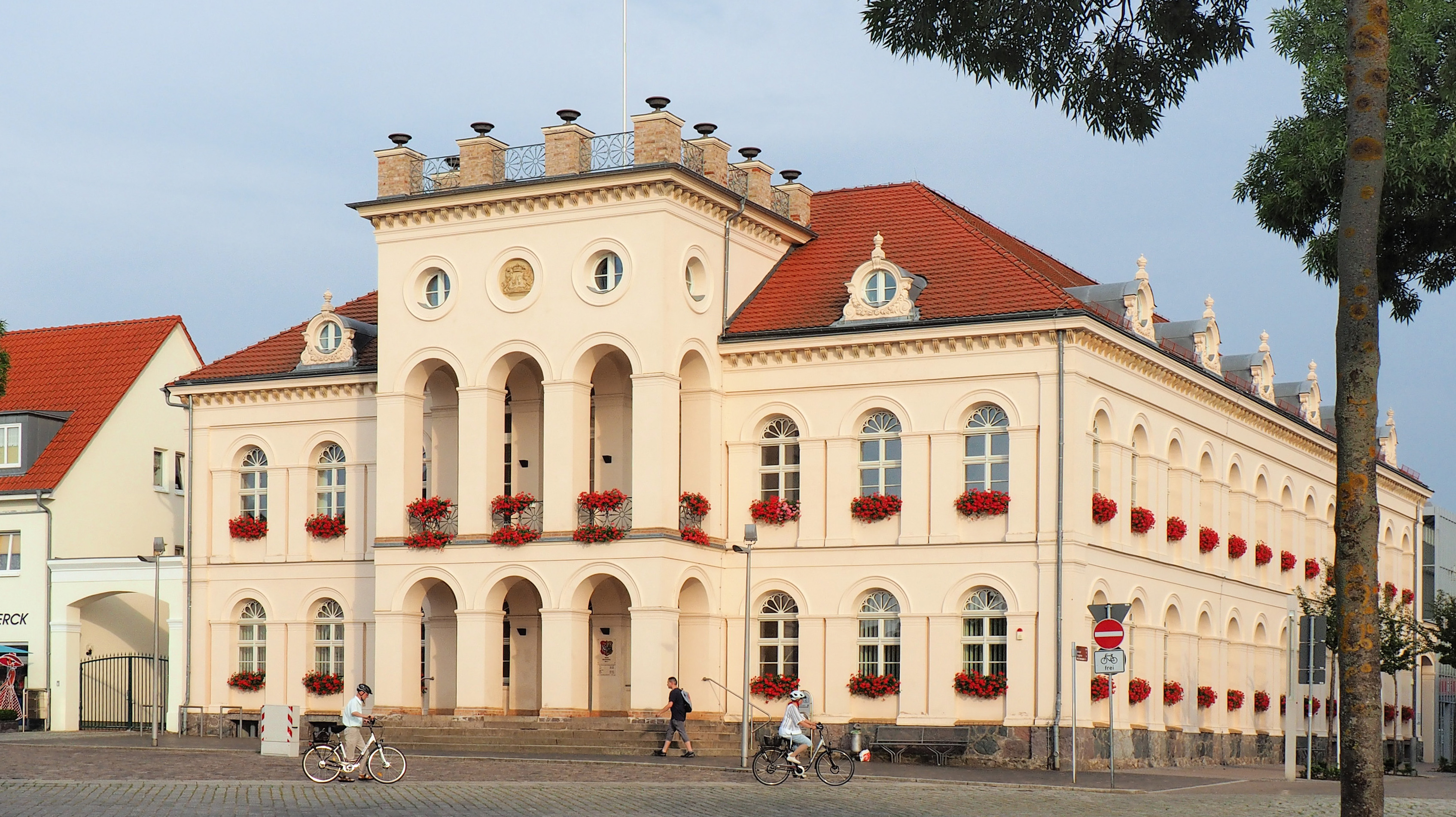
Neustrelitz Town Hall

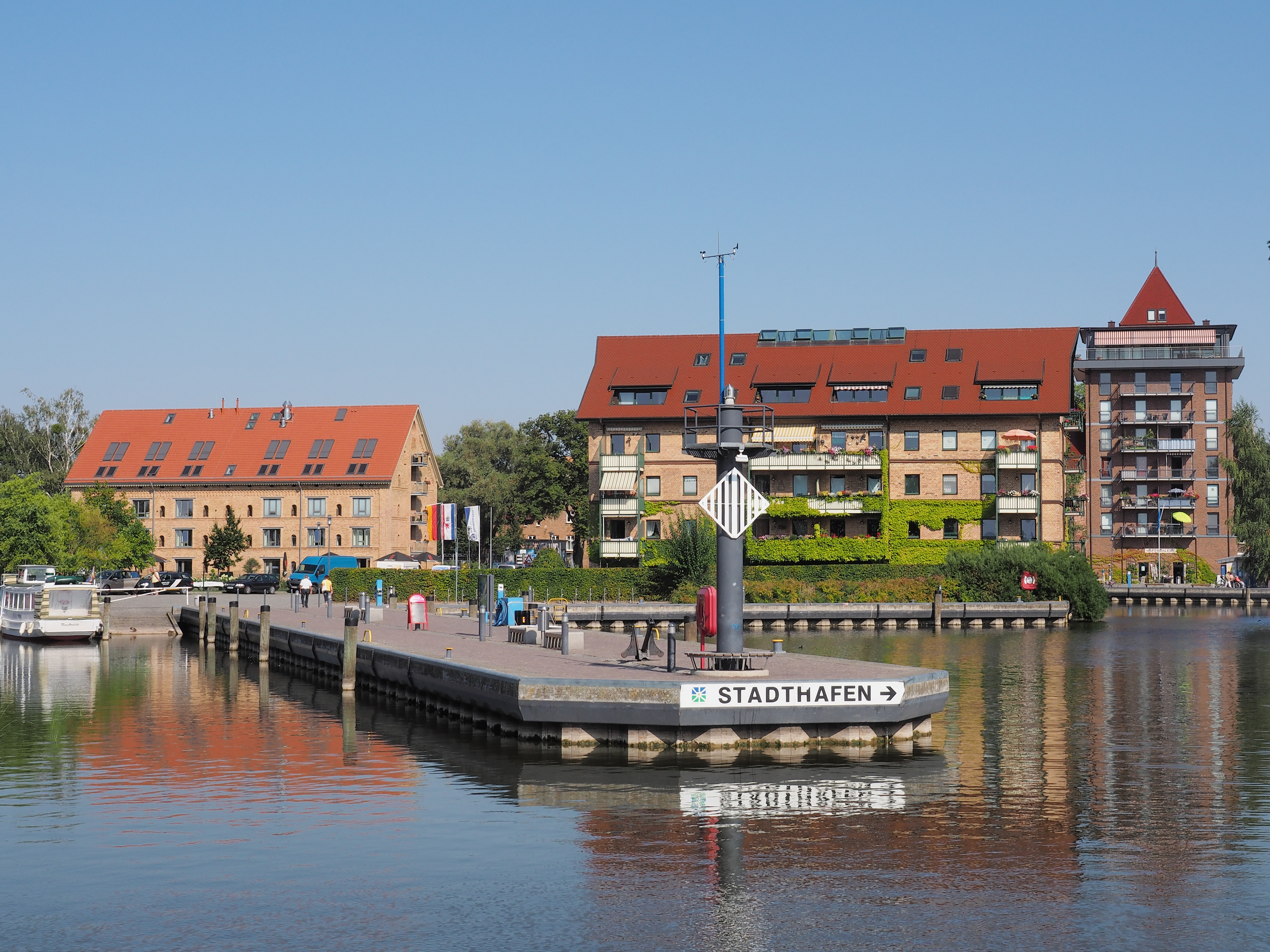
City harbour

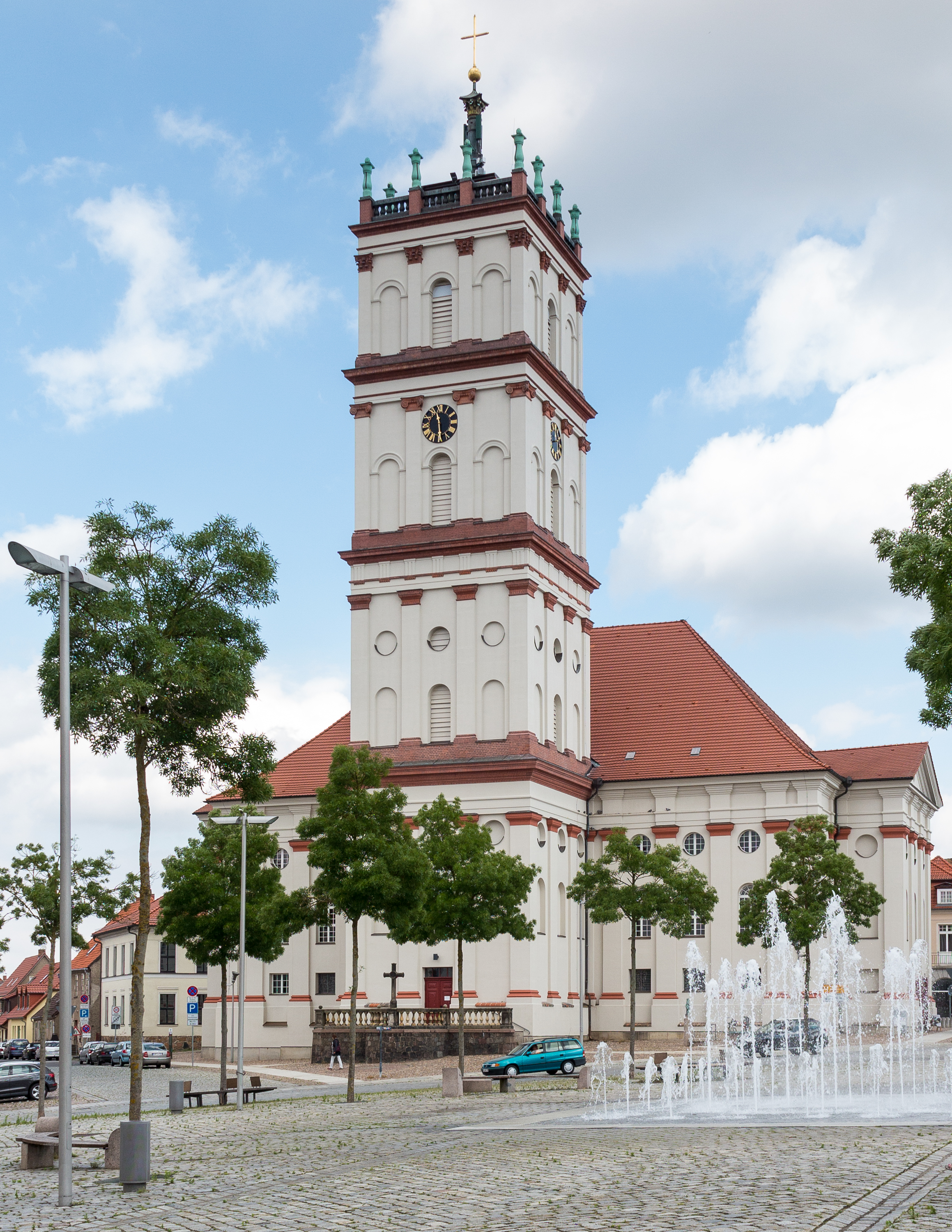
City church

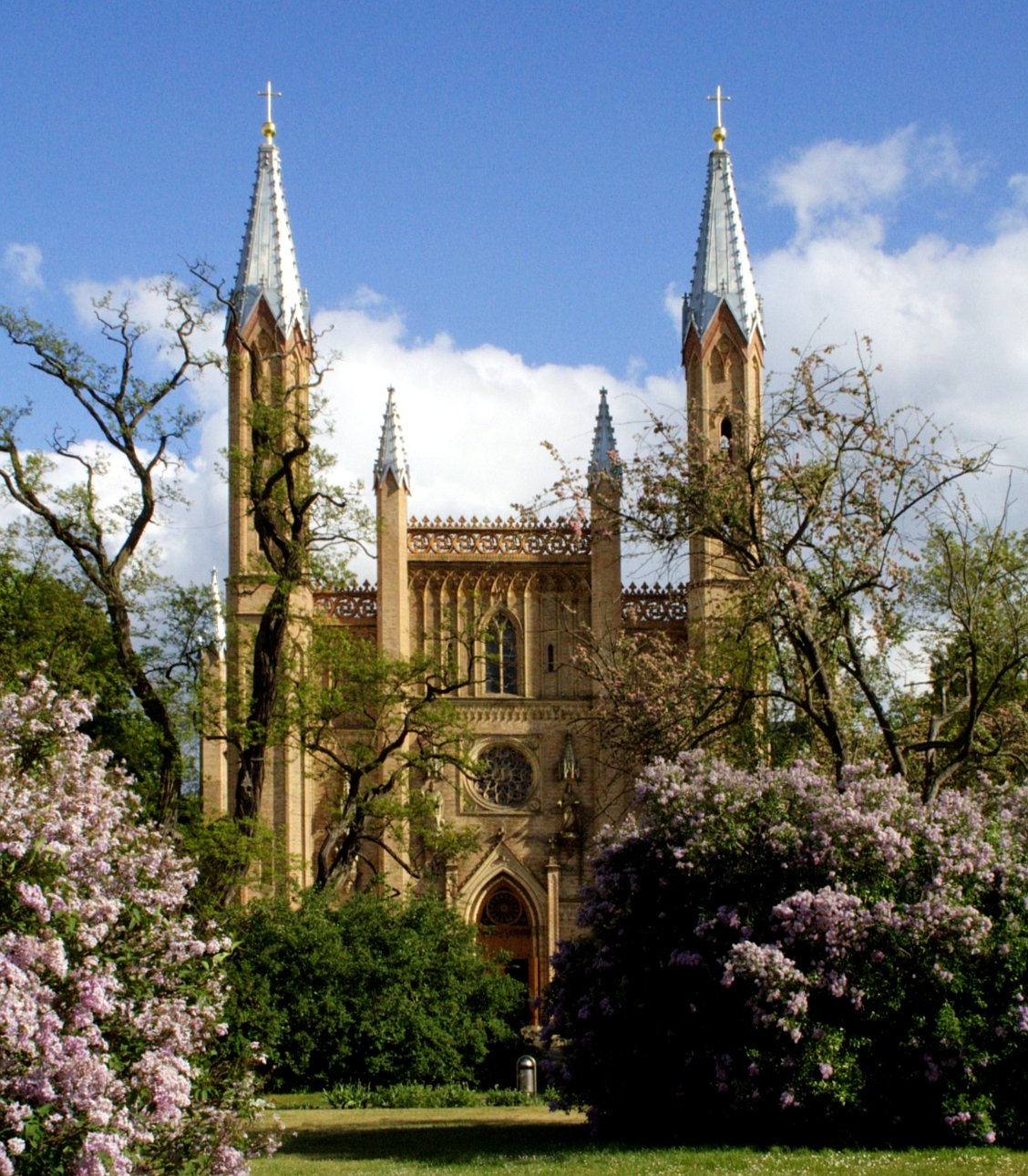
Castle church

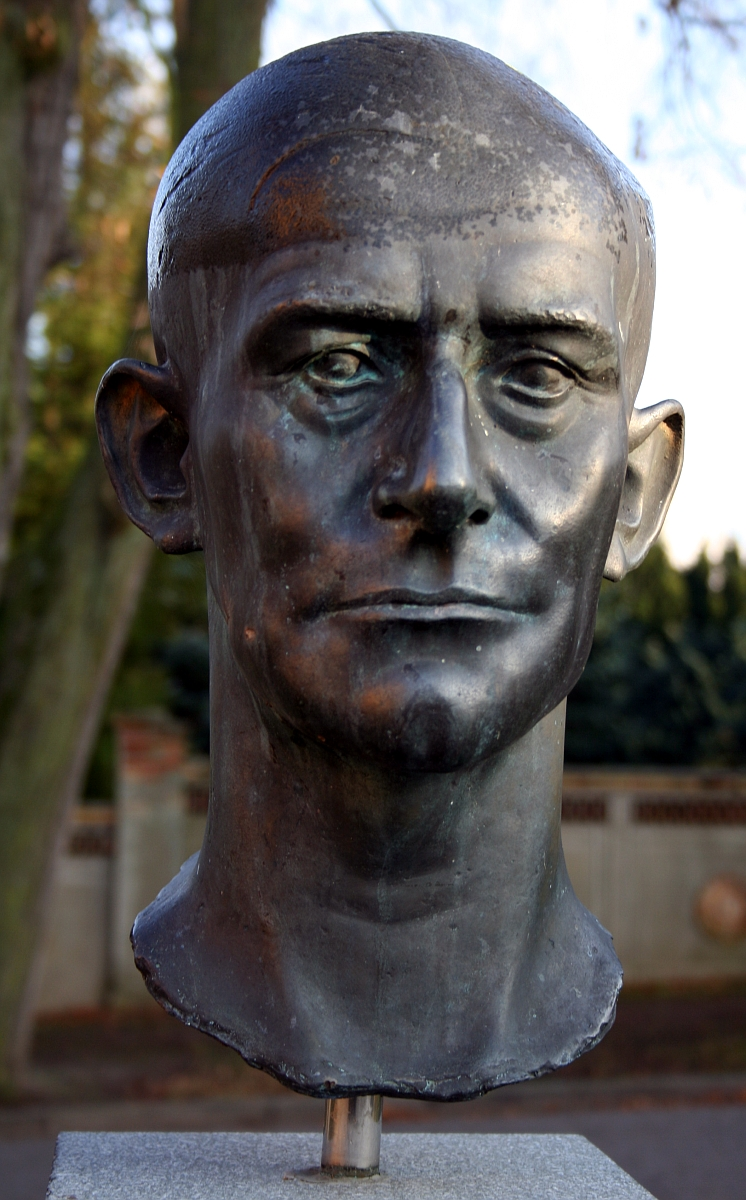
Friedrich Wolf

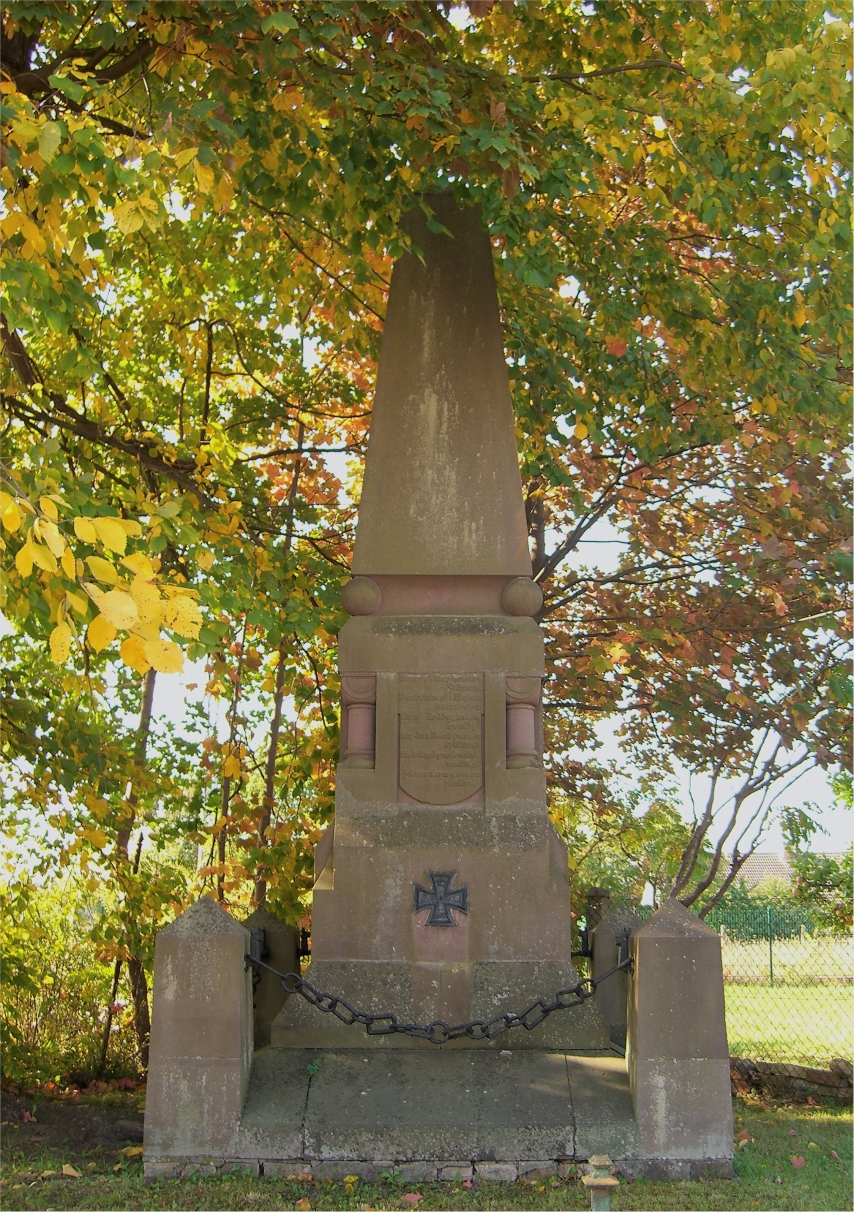
Franco-Prussian War memorial in Strelitz-Alt

== Entertainment ==
The city has hosted the popular Immergut Festival since the year 2000, attended by almost 5000 visitors each year.

Neustrelitz boasts its own theatre with a permanent resident cast. Drama, operas, operettas and musicals are regularly performed there. The theatre seats 400 persons.

== Notable people ==
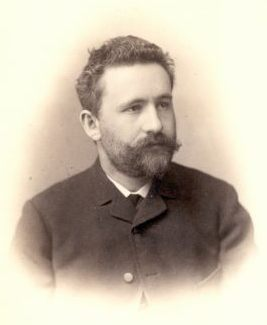
Emil Kraepelin, ca 1890

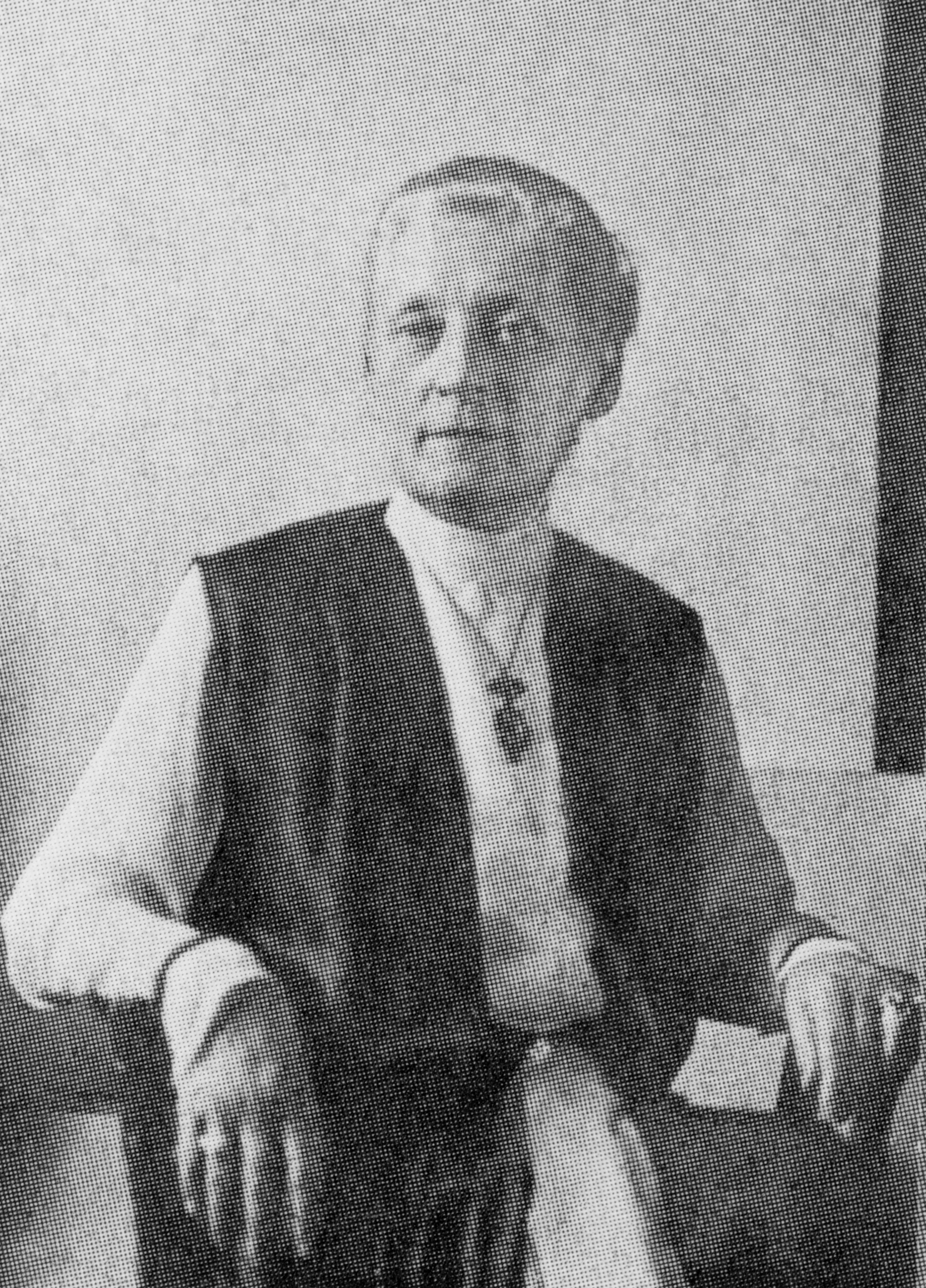
Marie Kundt

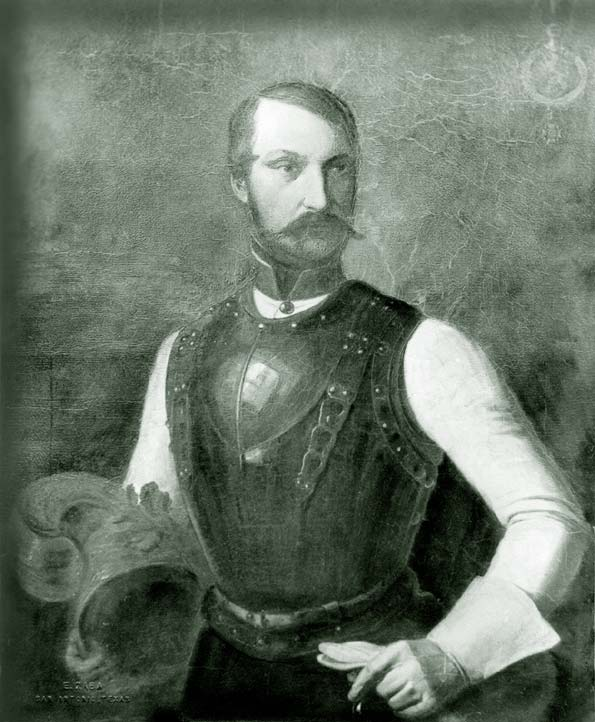
Prince Carl of Solms-Braunfels, ca 1840

- Adolf Friedrich von Olthof (1718–1793), a Swedish Pomeranian councillor and patron of the arts.
- Carl Eggers (1787–1863), history painter
- Albert Wolff (1814–1892), sculptor
- Wilhelm von Kardorff (1828–1907), landowner and politician
- Heinrich Gärtner (1828–1909), landscape painter.
- Karl Ludwig Ernst Schroeder (1838–1887), gynecologist
- Karl Kraepelin (1848–1915), biologist, founder of the Natural History Museum in Hamburg
- Emil Cohn (1854–1944), physicist worked on theoretical electromagnetism.
- Emil Kraepelin (1856–1926), psychiatrist, considered as father of modern psychiatry
- Hans Kundt (1869–1939), German-Bolivian general in the First World War and the Chacokrieg
- Marie Kundt (1870–1932), photographer, teacher and director at the Lette-Verein, Berlin
- Carl Friedrich Roewer (1881–1963), pedagogue, arachnologist and museum director
- Franz Rademacher (1906–1973), lawyer and diplomat.
- Herbert Wagner (born 1948), politician (CDU), Lord Mayor of Dresden 1990–2001
- Thomas Böttger (born 1957), composer and pianist
- Charly Hübner (born 1972), actor
- Anna Kovalchuk (born 1977), a Russian film, TV and theatre actress.

=== Aristocracy ===
- Adolphus Frederick III (1686–1752), Duke for the Duchy of Mecklenburg-Strelitz from 1708 to 1752.
- Duke Charles Louis Frederick of Mecklenburg (1708–1752), member of the Strelitz branch of the House of Mecklenburg.
- Prince Carl of Solms-Braunfels (1812–1875), German prince and military officer for Austria and the Grand Duchy of Hesse, he founded New Braunfels, Texas
- Frederick William (1819–1904), grand duke of Mecklenburg-Strelitz from 1860 to 1904.
- Kuno von Moltke (1847–1923) adjutant to Wilhelm II, main player in the Eulenburg affair.
- Adolphus Frederick V (1848–1914), grand duke of Mecklenburg-Strelitz from 1904 to 1914.
- Adolphus Frederick VI (1882–1918), the last reigning grand duke of Mecklenburg-Strelitz from 1914 to 1918.

=== Sport ===
- Bernhard Horwitz (1807–1885), chess master
- Rainer Ernst (born 1961), footballer, played over 330 games and 56 for East Germany
- Ulf Hoffmann (born 1961), gymnast, silver medallist at the 1988 Summer Olympics.
- Andreas Dittmer (born 1972), three time Olympic gold medallist in canoeing
- Olaf Winter (born 1973), gold medallist in canoeing at the 1996 Summer Olympics
- Andrei Kulebin (born 1984), Belarusian Muay Thai and Kickboxing World Champion

== International relations ==
=== Twin towns – Sister cities ===
Neustrelitz is twinned with:

- Chaykovsky, Russia
- Szczecinek, Poland
- Rovaniemi, Finland
- Schwäbisch Hall, Germany
