= SHEEP (symbolic computation system) =

Symbolic computation system

SHEEP is one of the earliest interactive symbolic computation systems. It is specialized for computations with tensors, and was designed for the needs of researchers working with general relativity and other theories involving extensive tensor calculus computations.

SHEEP is a freeware package (copyrighted, but free for educational and research use).

The name "SHEEP" is pun on the Lisp Algebraic Manipulator or LAM on which SHEEP is based. The package was written by Inge Frick, using earlier work by Ian Cohen and Ray d'Inverno, who had written ALAM - Atlas LISP Algebraic Manipulation in earlier (designed in 1970). SHEEP was an interactive computer package whereas LAM and ALAM were batch processing languages.

Jan E. Åman wrote an important package in SHEEP to carry out the Cartan-Karlhede algorithm. A more recent version of SHEEP, written by Jim Skea, runs under Cambridge Lisp, which is also used for REDUCE.

== See also ==
- GRTensorII
