= Lisp Algebraic Manipulator =

The Lisp Algebraic Manipulator (also known as LAM) was created by Ray d'Inverno, who had written Atlas LISP Algebraic Manipulation (ALAM was designed in 1970). LAM later became the basis for the interactive computer package SHEEP.
