= Herbert Wagner (politician) =

German politician

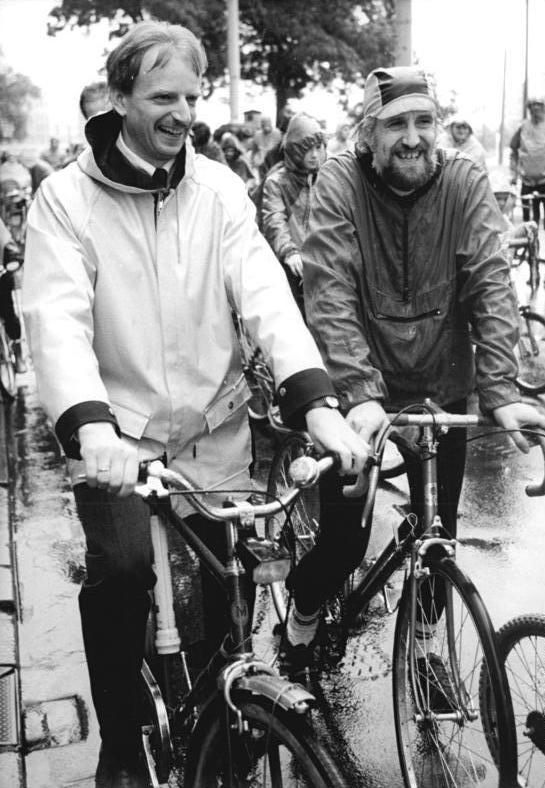
Herbert Wagner (left) in 1990)

Herbert Wagner (born 1948, in Neustrelitz) is a German politician.

Wagner was an engineer in Dresden when he became involved in the dialogue between protesters and the mayor of Dresden, Wolfgang Berghofer, in October 1989. He became one of the organizers of the Monday demonstrations in Dresden.

After the fall of the communist regime, Wagner became a member of the CDU political party, and was elected mayor of Dresden in May 1990. He was re-elected in 1994, but was defeated in the 2001 election.
