= Heinrich Gärtner =

German painter

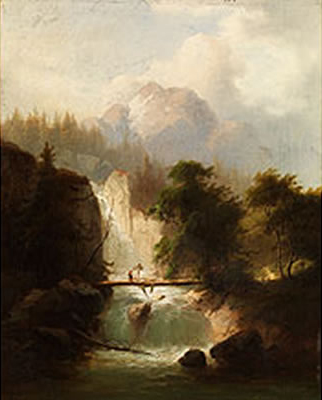
Waterfall with Wooden Bridge

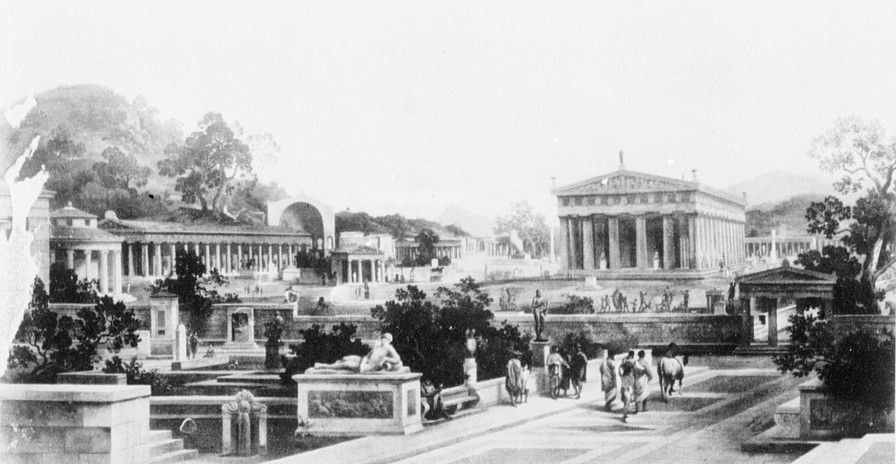
Die Altis von Olympia

Heinrich Gärtner (1828–1909) was a German landscape painter.

== Biography ==
He was born in Neustrelitz. He was a pupil of F. W. Schirmer in Berlin, and of Ludwig Richter in Dresden, whence he went to Rome to study the old masters, and there was also much influenced by Cornelius. He became favorably known after his return to Germany, through several decorative cycles, executed in private houses and villas, and was commissioned to paint some of the mural decorations in the new Court Theatre at Dresden, and after that the encaustic paintings in the Hall of Sculptures in the Leipzig Museum (1879). Three landscapes by him (1883–1885) adorn the staircase of the Agricultural Museum in Berlin. Of his oil paintings there is a “Landscape with the Return of the Prodigal Son” in the Leipzig Museum, and one with “Adam, Eve, Cain, and Abel” in the Dresden Gallery. Gärtner died in Dresden.

== See also ==
- List of German painters
