= Wolfgang Kundt =

German astrophysicist (born 1931)

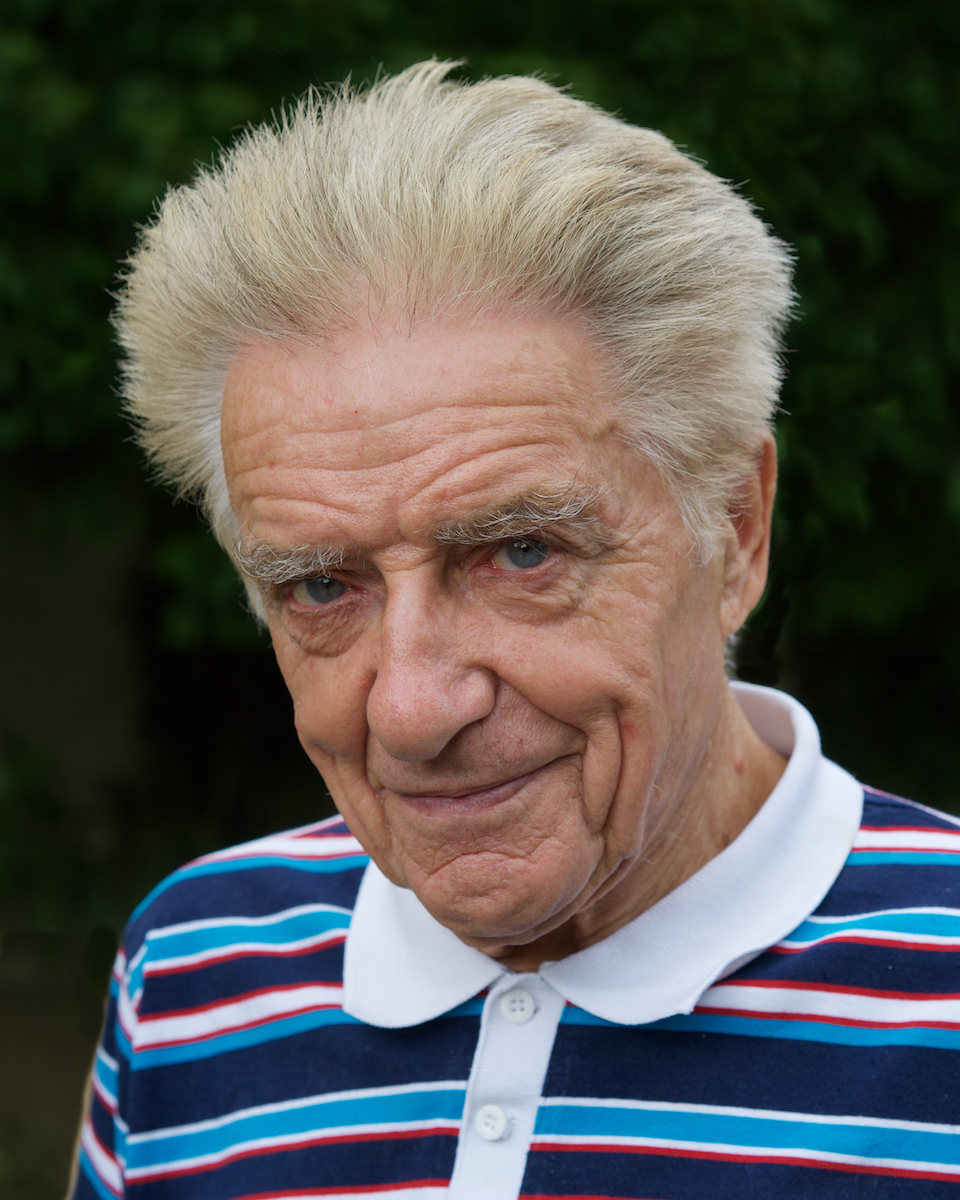
- Kundt in 2017
- Born: 3 June 1931 (age 94); Hamburg, Germany
- Children: 2
- Scientific career
- Fields: Astrophysics
- Doctoral advisor: Pascual Jordan

Wolfgang Kundt (born 3 June 1931) is a German astrophysicist. He studied Theoretical Physics in Hamburg, centered on general relativity, and got his diploma in 1956 and his PhD in 1959, advised by Pascual Jordan.

== Career ==
With Jürgen Ehlers and Engelbert Schücking, Kundt collaborated in a joint seminar, known as Hamburg's "Jordan Seminar" on general relativity. In 1965, he habilitated at Hamburg on "Canonical Quantisation of gauge-invariant Field Theories", and was subsequently Lecturer and, since 1971, Scientific Adviser and Professor at the University of Hamburg. When Jordan had reached retirement age in 1977, Wolfgang Priester called him to the University of Bonn, where he remained active beyond his own retirement in 1996, until today. During his career, his scientific interests expanded to include astrophysics, geophysics and biophysics.

Kundt was a visiting researcher at the following universities and research institutes: in Syracuse (N.Y.,1959), Pittsburgh (Pa.,1966 ), CERN (1972), Bielefeld (1973), Kiel(1974), Hamburg (1975–76), Kyoto (Japan, 1978), Boston (1986), Bangalore (1987), Linz (1999), Hsinchu (Taiwan, 2002), Maribor (Slovenia, 2004), Rio de Janeiro (2008, 2010, 2012), Buenos Aires (2012) and Gonder (Ethiopia, 2015).

From 1969 to 1979, he also conducted the (passive) celestial mechanics experiment E11 of the German-American spacecraft project HELIOS, which for technical reasons had to be eventually sacrificed to the ten active experiments on board.

Besides Jordan and Ehlers, he had scientific contacts with (in historical order): Klaus Hasselmann, Wolfgang Pauli, Roger Penrose, Peter Bergmann, Thomas Gold, John A. Wheeler, Felix Pirani, Brandon Carter, Hermann Bondi, Rolf Hagedorn, Nigel Holloway, Nino Zichichi, Peter Scheuer, Richard Feynman, Malvin Ruderman, Philip Morrison, David Layzer, Zdenek Kopal, John Maddox and Paul Dirac.

In 1984, Zichichi asked him to direct yearly courses at Erice, on neutron stars, active galactic nuclei and astrophysical jets.

His scientific interests thereby moved from gravitational waves (of general relativity) to neutron stars black holes and accretion disks, to the astrophysical jets, to supernova explosions and gamma-ray bursts, further to terrestrial plate tectonics, to the Tunguska event (1908), and to the osmotically pumped water circulation in plants. With these widely spaced interests, he followed his teacher Pascual Jordan, and decades-long friend Thomas Gold - both known for their often "alternative" interpretations – they influenced his more than 300 publications, among them an article entitled "The Gold Effect: Odyssey of Scientific Research" (1998) and the two books "Astrophysics, a new approach" (2005), and "Physikalische Mythen auf dem Prüfstand" (2014).

In his publications since 1978, Kundt has increasingly expressed doubts about the existence of black holes. He claims that they are a scientific error and, if they existed, would have swallowed us long ago. Rather, he believes that the cores of large galaxies are hydrogen-rich, nuclear-burning plasma disks, which he calls "burning discs".

A new explanation has been given by Kundt in his 1999 analysis of the Tunguska event based on the facts collected by Moscow's Andrei Olchowatow, as the present-day formation of a kimberlite, in which ten megatons of methane were explosively ejected, whose icy remnants in the upper atmosphere caused three bright nights to follow in Europe.

In 2004, together with Gopal Krishna, he succeeded in a unified, analytical description of all jet types, independent of their size, independent of the reception of optical and/or x-ray emission lines, only very rarely branching, in almost pressure-free, but sometimes also extreme high-pressure regions of the cosmos, starting at supersonic speed, but often switching into the subsonic range.

Kundt married in 1966 and has a daughter, Liane, and a son, Rasko.

== Selected works ==
- Astrophysics. A Primer. Springer, Berlin u. a. 2001, ISBN 3-540-41748-6 (2nd edition: Astrophysics. A New Approach. ebenda 2005, ISBN 3-540-22346-0).
- As editor: Neutron Stars and their Birth Events (= NATO ASI Series. C: Mathematical and Physical Sciences. 300). Kluwer, Dordrecht u. a. 1990, ISBN 0-7923-0596-5.
- Kosmische Überschallstrahlen. In: Rheinisch-Westfälische Akademie der Wissenschaften. Natur-, Ingenieur- und Wirtschaftswissenschaften. Vorträge. N 359, 1988, ISSN 0066-5754, S. 7–28.
- As editor: Astrophysical Jets and their Engines (= NATO ASI Series. C: Mathematical and Physical Sciences. 208). Reidel, Dordrecht u. a. 1987, ISBN 90-277-2548-9.
- As editor: Physik des Sonnensystems und der Kometen (= Studium Universale. Bd. 6). Bouvier, Bonn 1985, ISBN 3-416-04006-6.
- With Jürgen Ehlers: Exact solutions of gravitational field equations. In: Louis Witten (Hrsg.): Gravitation. An Introduction to Current Research. Wiley, New York u. a. 1962, S. 49–101.
- With Ole Marggraf: Physikalische Mythen auf dem Prüfstand. Eine Sammlung begründeter Alternativtheorien von Geophysik über Kosmologie bis Teilchenphysik, Springer 2014, ISBN 978-3-642-37705-1
- Jets from Stars and Burning Disks - The SS 433 System - Our Galactic Center - Epilogue, in: W. Kundt (Hrsg.), Jets from Stars and Galactic Nuclei, Lecture Notes in Physics 471, Springer 1996, S. 1–18, 140–144, 265–270, 284–287.

== See also ==
- Kundt spacetime
- pp-wave spacetime
