= Neustrelitz Palace =

Ancient palace in Neustrelitz, Germany

Coordinates: 53°21′33″N 13°3′28″E

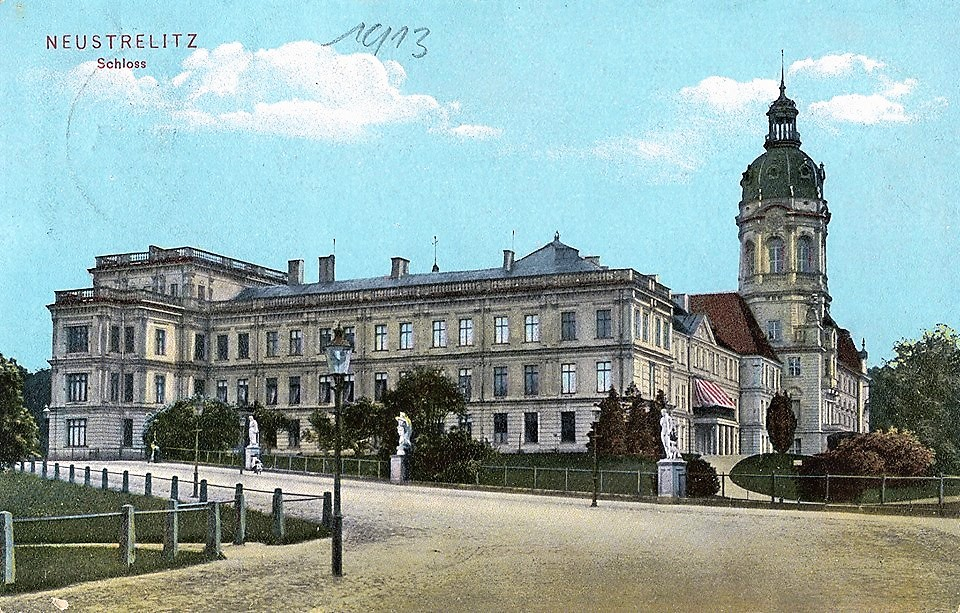
Neustrelitz Palace around 1920

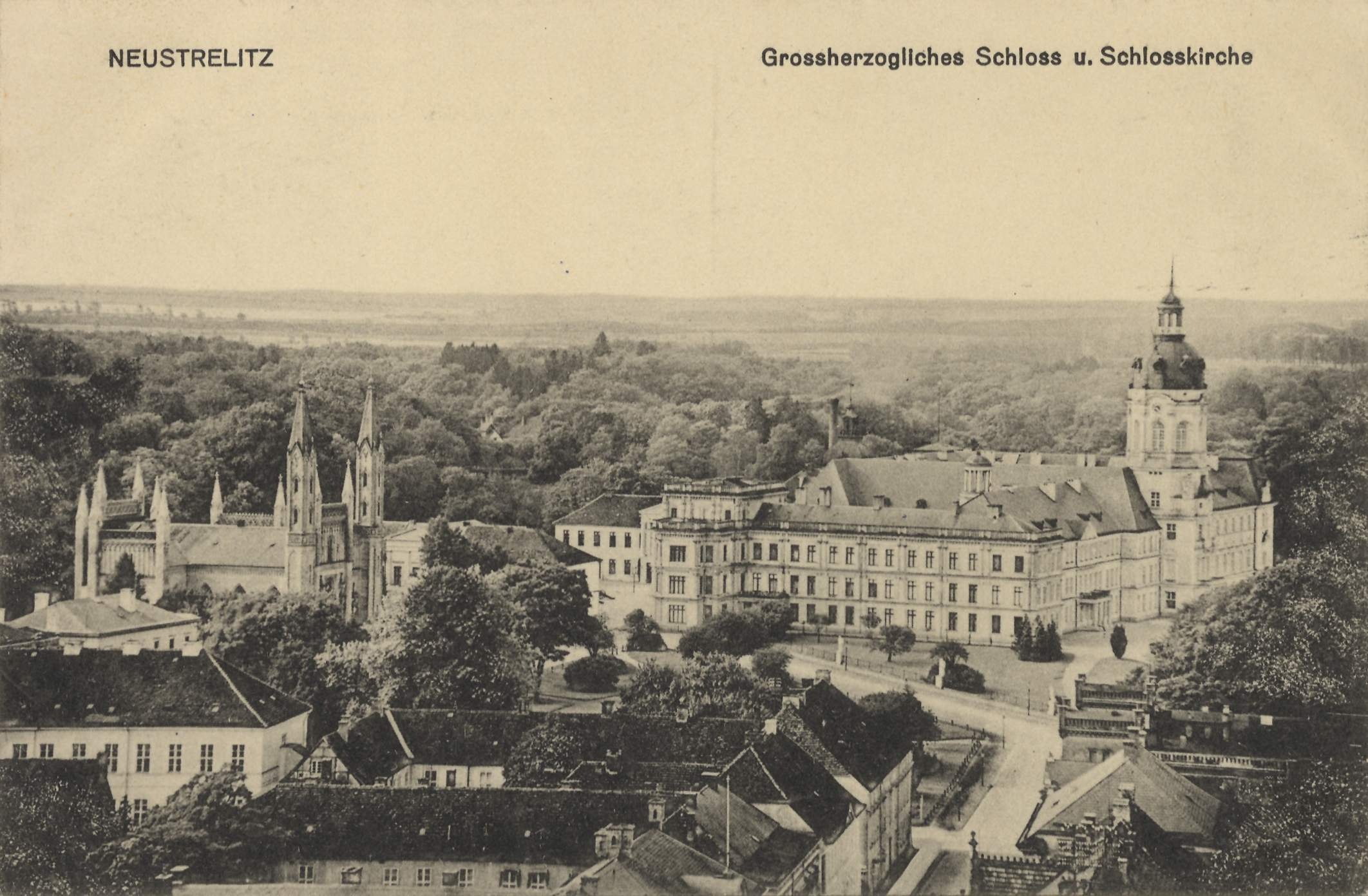
Neustrelitz Palace

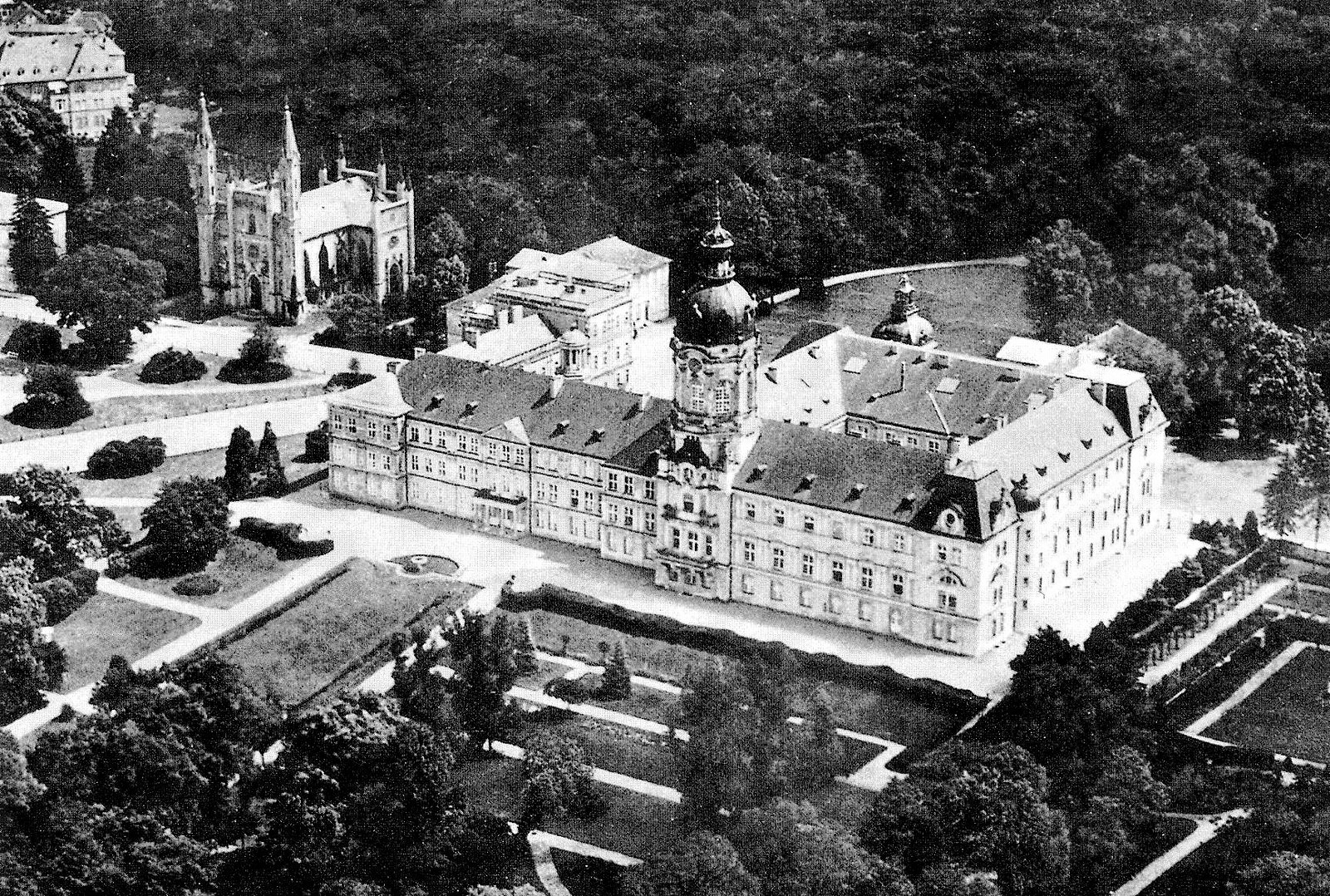
Neustrelitz Palace around 1920

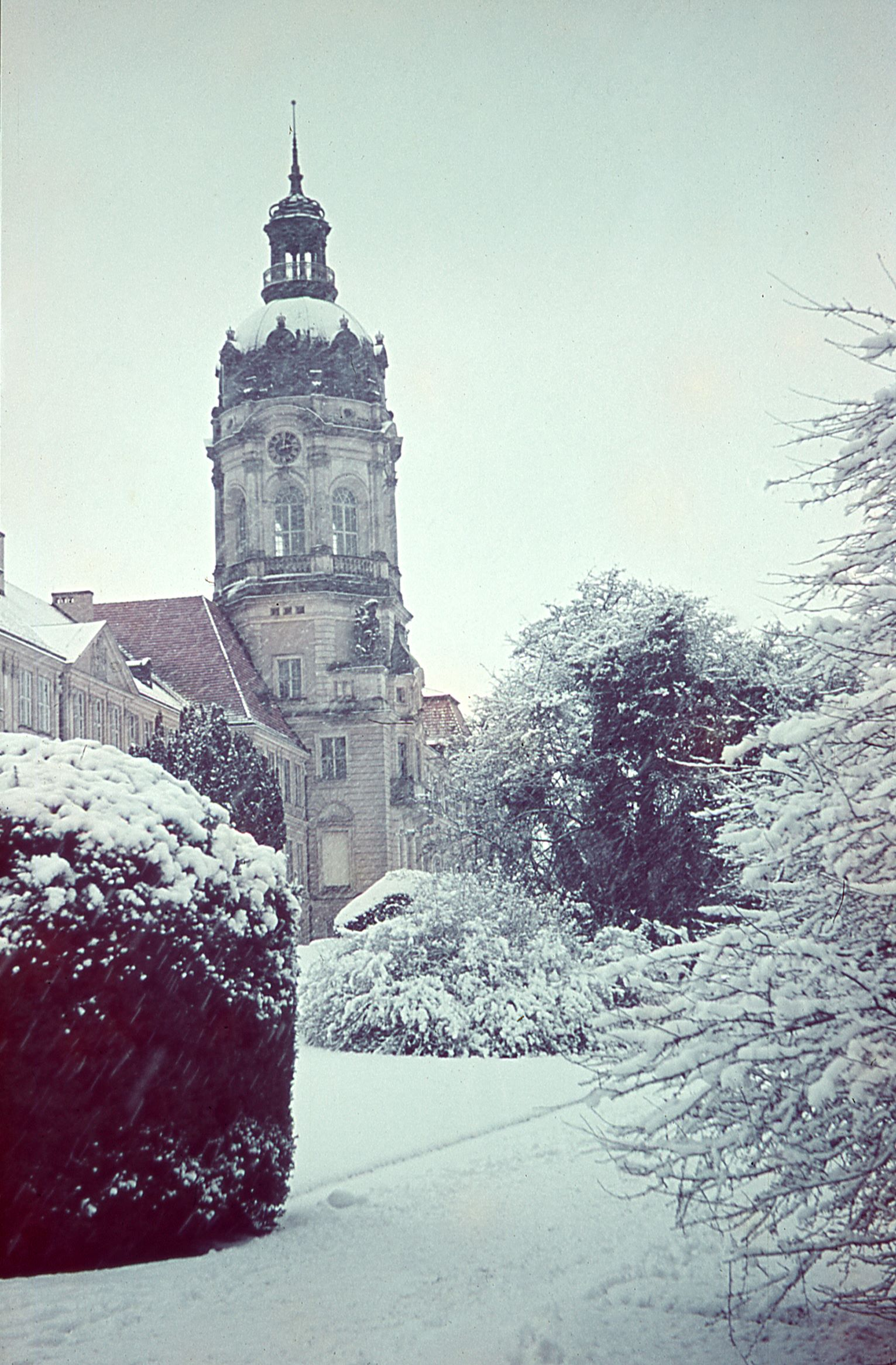
Neustrelitz Palace Tower in Winter 1940

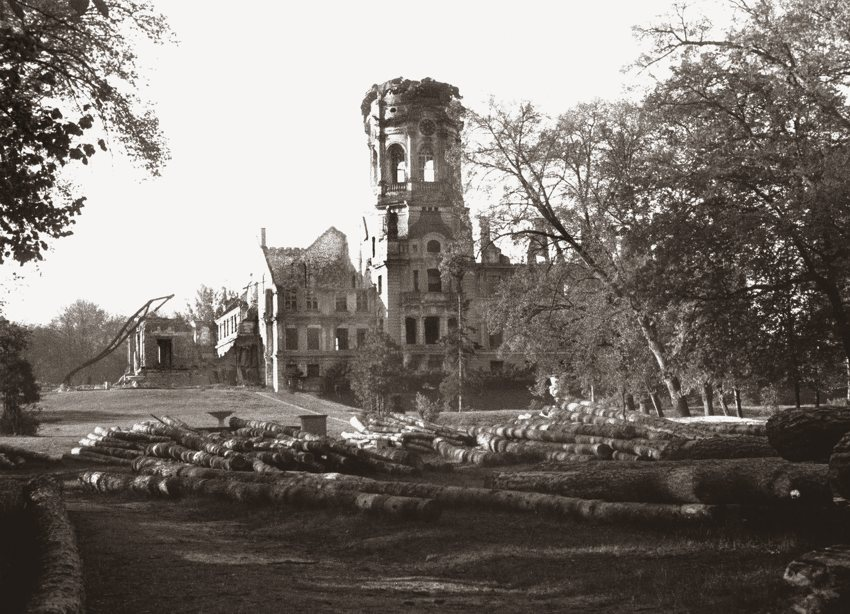
Neustrelitz Palace Ruins around 1949

The Neustrelitz Palace (German: Schloss Neustrelitz) in Neustrelitz in Mecklenburg-Western Pomerania, Germany was a princely palace, which mostly served as the main residence of the Grand Dukes of Mecklenburg-Strelitz. The palace was destroyed during World War II and was not reconstructed, although possible. Only the park remains today.

== History ==
The Neustrelitz Palace was originally constructed as a hunting lodge in Glienke on the Zierker lake around 1710/ 1711. After the castle in Strelitz was burned down in the eve of 24 October 1712, the ducal family was forced to live in hunting lodges for a number of years. The architect Christoph Julius Löwe transformed the hunting lodge into a baroque style three-story, three-winged palace. It became the principal residence of duke Adolf Friedrich in 1733. Around the palace, the city of Neustrelitz was constructed which eventually became the new capital of the duchy. Over the years the palace expanded and changed, lastly between 1905 and 1909. It remained the seats of the Duke and Grand Dukes up to 1918 when the monarchy in Germany came to an end. The palace became property of the new Free State of Mecklenburg-Strelitz. It served as parliament and museum. The Palace was destroyed during a fire in the night of 29 April 1945. Although parts of palace could have been restored, the Communist regime of East Germany decided to demolish it for ideological reasons. Only the foundations remained.

== Reconstruction ==
In the 1990s, there were initiatives to reconstruct sections of the palace. Finally in December 2019, the Government of Mecklenburg-Vorpommern and Mayor of Neustrelitz signed an agreement to clear the surviving castle basement of sand, construct a concrete ceiling for it, and commence planning for reconstruction of the tower.

After ten years of restoration and reconstruction, the Neustrelitz Palace Gardens were re-opened to the public in the summer of 2019.

== Bibliography ==
- Otto Wagner [Hrsg.]: Fremdenführer von Neustrelitz und Umgebung. Neustrelitz 1926.
- Michael Gust: Das Neustrelitzer Residenzschloss. cw strelitzia, Neustrelitz 1998.
- Gerlinde Kienitz: Schlosspark Neustrelitz. Hrsg.: Museum der Stadt Neustrelitz ca. 2000. (Broschüre mit Fotos von Horst-Günter Jung ohne Angabe des Erscheinungsjahrs).
- Friederike Drinkuth: Männlicher als ihr Gemahl. Herzogin Dorothea Sophie von Schleswig-Holstein-Sonderburg-Plön, Gemahlin Adolph Friedrichs III. von Mecklenburg-Strelitz. Regentin und Stadtgründerin von Neustrelitz. Thomas Helms Verlag Schwerin 2016. ISBN 978-3-944033-00-6.
- Georg Alexander Herzog zu Mecklenburg: Das Haus Mecklenburg-Strelitz und seine Schlösser in Bruno J. Sobotka/ Jürgen Strauss: "Burgen, Schlösser, Gutshäuser in Mecklenburg-Vorpommern." Theiss Verlag, Stuttgart 1993. ISBN 3-8062-1084-5 (pages 59-65)
- Torsten Foelsch: Das Residenzschloß zu Neustrelitz. Ein verschwundenes Schloß in Mecklenburg. Foelsch & Fanselow Verlag, Groß Gottschow 2016. ISBN 978-3-9816377-1-7.
