= Erich Kretschmann =

German physicist

Erich Justus Kretschmann (14 July 1887 – 1973) was a German physicist.

== Life ==
Kretschmann was born in Berlin. He obtained his PhD at Berlin University in 1914 with his dissertation entitled "Eine Theorie der Schwerkraft im Rahmen der ursprünglichen Einsteinschen Relativitätstheorie" (A theory of gravity in the framework of the original Einstein theory of relativity). His advisors were Max Planck and Heinrich Rubens. After working as a Gymnasium (school) teacher, he became Privatdozent for theoretical physics at the University of Königsberg in 1920, where he eventually became professor extraordinarius in 1926. From 1946 until 1952, Kretschmann was professor for theoretical physics and director of the institute for theoretical physics at the University of Halle-Wittenberg.

== Work ==
In his 1915 papers, he introduced the Kretschmann scalar. In his 1915 papers he also introduced, though not in name, the point coincidence argument in relativity. Similar ideas appeared in Einstein's writings on general relativity. Historians Don Howard and John D. Norton suggest that Einstein may have failed to adequately acknowledge Kretschmann's contribution. Kretschmann's use of the argument was more topological while Einstein's use involved physical measurements.

Kretschmann is most famous for his 1917 claim that Einstein's use of the principle of covariance in General Relativity is vacuous. Kretschmann claimed that the demand that a theory be put in generally covariant form does not limit or restrict the range of acceptable theories, but is simply a challenge to the mathematician's ingenuity. According to Kretschmann, any theory can be put in generally covariant form. Einstein responded that even if general covariance is not a purely formal limitation on acceptable theories, it plays "an important heuristic role" in the formulation of General Relativity.

Einstein wrote concerning Kretschmann's objection: "Although it is true that every empirical law can be put in a generally covariant form, yet the principle of relativity possesses a great heuristic power....Of two theoretical systems, both of which agree with experience, the one is to be preferred which, from the point of view of the absolute differential calculus is the simpler and more transparent. Let one express Newtonian mechanics four-dimensionally in the form of generally covariant equations and one will surely be convinced that the principle of relativity excludes this theory from the practical, though not the theoretical, viewpoint." (Einstein, Albert, 1918. "Principielles zur allgemeinen Relativitätstheorie," Annalen der Physik, vol. 55, esp. p. 242)

Einstein suggested that Newtonian theory would be impossibly complex if put in covariant form, although since Einstein made that claim it has been formulated in covariant form by several physicists, including Élie Cartan in 1923 and Kurt Otto Friedrichs in 1927. Charles W. Misner, Kip Thorne, and John Archibald Wheeler, in their textbook Gravitation (1973) Ch. 12 present the covariant version of Newtonian theory.

In a letter of 1927 to Karl Försterling Arnold Sommerfeld wrote favorably of Kretschmann's work in relativity and the statistics of electrons, but said that he needed to get a different teaching position (get away from Königsberg) in order to be able to do more research.

The issue of whether covariance is a real restriction and if so in what sense appears in various contributions to the philosophical debate concerning Einstein's "hole argument." This argument initially had led Einstein in 1913 for a time to reject generally covariant theories, because a region of space/time without forces would undermine determinism or unique extension of trajectories. He later concluded that space/time points without gravity would not be individuated.

It has been claimed also that Kretschmann discovered that the conformal geometry of General Relativity corresponds to the light cone structure, a point rediscovered by and extensively exploited by Hermann Weyl, and since then developed by Jürgen Ehlers and collaborators.

Kretschmann's prose is so convoluted and obscure that reception and appreciation of his work was generally delayed. James L. Anderson in the mid-1960s made Kretschmann's work more well-known, though he used it as an object of criticism with respect to Kretschmann's claims concerning the symmetry groups of special and general relativity.

Kretschmann published half a dozen less noted papers during the 1920s and early 1930s, the last two in 1934, though he continued to live in Germany for decades.

His 1934 paper Beitrag zur Kritik der Blochschen Theorie der Elektrizitätsleitung, although it has only 17 citations as of the end of the year 2021, might be of some historical interest. According to Rudolf Peierls:

An important episode for my understanding of conduction problems arose from a paper by Kretschmann,^{(15)} who attacked the then accepted theory of conductivity and claimed that the basis of the papers by Bloch and others was quite wrong. He had a number of objections which were mostly not very well conceived, but he claimed, in particular, that in the usual derivation of the Boltzmann equation one had made unjustified use of perturbation theory. In trying to defend the theory I therefore set out to prove that perturbation theory was in order, and to my amazement I found that this was very questionable, if not exactly for the reasons given by Kretschmann. It appeared that the usual application of Fermi's 'golden rule' depended on the inequality
ħ/τ ≪ kT,
where τ is the collision time. This was not satisfied for many metals. Indeed Landau's dimensional analysis made them comparable. ...

REFERENCES
...
(15) Kretschmann, E. 1934 Z. Phys. 87, 518.

== Major works ==
- Kretschmann, Erich. 1915. Über die prinzipielle Bestimmbarkeit der berechtigten Bezugssysteme beliebiger Relativitätstheorien (I), (II). Annalen der Physik 48: 907–942, 943–982. Teil I; Teil II
- Kretschmann, Erich. 1917. Über den physikalischen Sinn der Relativitätspostulate. A. Einsteins neue und seine ursprüngliche Relativitätstheorie. Annalen der Physik 53: 575–614.
