= Vanishing scalar invariant spacetime =

Type of Lorentzian manifolds

In mathematical physics, vanishing scalar invariant (VSI) spacetimes are Lorentzian manifolds in which all polynomial curvature invariants of all orders are vanishing. Although the only Riemannian manifold with the VSI property is flat space, the Lorentzian case admits nontrivial spacetimes with this property. Distinguishing these VSI spacetimes from Minkowski spacetime requires comparing non-polynomial invariants or carrying out the full Cartan–Karlhede algorithm on non-scalar quantities.

All VSI spacetimes are a subset of Kundt spacetimes. An example of a VSI spacetime in four dimensions is a pp-wave. However, VSI spacetimes also contain some other four-dimensional Kundt spacetimes of Petrov type N and III. VSI spacetimes in higher dimensions have similar properties to the four-dimensional case.
