= Kundt spacetime =

Lorentzian manifold

In mathematical physics, Kundt spacetimes are Lorentzian manifolds admitting a geodesic null congruence with vanishing optical scalars (expansion, twist and shear). A well known member of Kundt class is pp-wave. Ricci-flat Kundt spacetimes in arbitrary dimension are algebraically special. In four dimensions Ricci-flat Kundt metrics of Petrov type III and N are completely known. All VSI spacetimes belong to a subset of the Kundt spacetimes.
