= Carminati–McLenaghan invariants =

In general relativity, the Carminati–McLenaghan invariants or CM scalars are a set of 16 scalar curvature invariants for the Riemann tensor. This set is usually supplemented with at least two additional invariants.

== Mathematical definition ==
The CM invariants consist of 6 real scalars plus 5 complex scalars, making a total of 16 invariants. They are defined in terms of the Weyl tensor $C_{abcd}$ and its right (or left) dual ${{}^\star C}_{ijkl}=(1/2)\epsilon_{klmn}C_{ij}{}^{mn}$, the Ricci tensor $R_{ab}$, and the trace-free Ricci tensor

$$S_{ab} = R_{ab} - \frac{1}{4} \, R \, g_{ab}$$

In the following, it may be helpful to note that if we regard ${S^a}_b$ as a matrix, then ${S^a}_m \, {S^m}_b$ is the square of this matrix, so the trace of the square is ${S^a}_b \, {S^b}_a$, and so forth.

The real CM scalars are:

1. $R = {R^m}_m$ (the trace of the Ricci tensor)
2. $R_1 = \frac{1}{4} \, {S^a}_b \, {S^b}_a$
3. $R_2 = -\frac{1}{8} \, {S^a}_b \, {S^b}_c \, {S^c}_a$
4. $R_3 = \frac{1}{16} \, {S^a}_b \, {S^b}_c \, {S^c}_d \, {S^d}_a$
5. $M_3 = \frac{1}{16} \, S^{bc} \, S_{ef} \left( C_{abcd} \, C^{aefd} + {{}^\star C}_{abcd} \, {{}^\star C}^{aefd} \right)$
6. $M_4 = -\frac{1}{32} \, S^{ag} \, S^{ef} \, {S^c}_d \, \left( {C_{ac}}^{db} \, C_{befg} + {{{}^\star C}_{ac}}^{db} \, {{}^\star C}_{befg} \right)$

The complex CM scalars are:

1. $W_1 = \frac{1}{8} \, \left( C_{abcd} + i \, {{}^\star C}_{abcd} \right) \, C^{abcd}$
2. $W_2 = -\frac{1}{16} \, \left( {C_{ab}}^{cd} + i \, {{{}^\star C}_{ab}}^{cd} \right) \, {C_{cd}}^{ef} \, {C_{ef}}^{ab}$
3. $M_1 = \frac{1}{8} \, S^{ab} \, S^{cd} \, \left( C_{acdb} + i \, {{}^\star C}_{acdb} \right)$
4. $M_2 = \frac{1}{16} \, S^{bc} \, S_{ef} \, \left( C_{abcd} \, C^{aefd} - {{}^\star C}_{abcd} \, {{}^\star C}^{aefd} \right) + \frac{1}{8} \, i \, S^{bc} \, S_{ef} \, {{}^\star C}_{abcd} \, C^{aefd}$
5. $M_5 = \frac{1}{32} \, S^{cd} \, S^{ef} \, \left( C^{aghb} + i \, {{}^\star C}^{aghb} \right) \, \left( C_{acdb} \, C_{gefh} + {{}^\star C}_{acdb} \, {{}^\star C}_{gefh} \right)$

The CM scalars have the following degrees:

1. $R$ is linear,
2. $R_1, \, W_1$ are quadratic,
3. $R_2, \, W_2, \, M_1$ are cubic,
4. $R_3, \, M_2, \, M_3$ are quartic,
5. $M_4, \, M_5$ are quintic.

They can all be expressed directly in terms of the Ricci spinors and Weyl spinors, using Newman–Penrose formalism; see the link below.

== Complete sets of invariants ==
In the case of spherically symmetric spacetimes or planar symmetric spacetimes, it is known that

$$R, \, R_1, \, R_2, \, R_3, \, \Re (W_1), \, \Re (M_1), \, \Re (M_2)$$
$$\frac{1}{32} \, S^{cd} \, S^{ef} \, C^{aghb} \, C_{acdb} \, C_{gefh}$$

comprise a complete set of invariants for the Riemann tensor. In the case of vacuum solutions, electrovacuum solutions and perfect fluid solutions, the CM scalars comprise a complete set. Additional invariants may be required for more general spacetimes; determining the exact number (and possible syzygies among the various invariants) is an open problem.

== See also ==
- Curvature invariant, for more about curvature invariants in (semi)-Riemannian geometry in general
- Curvature invariant (general relativity), for other curvature invariants which are useful in general relativity
