= Marie Kundt =

German photographer (1870–1932)

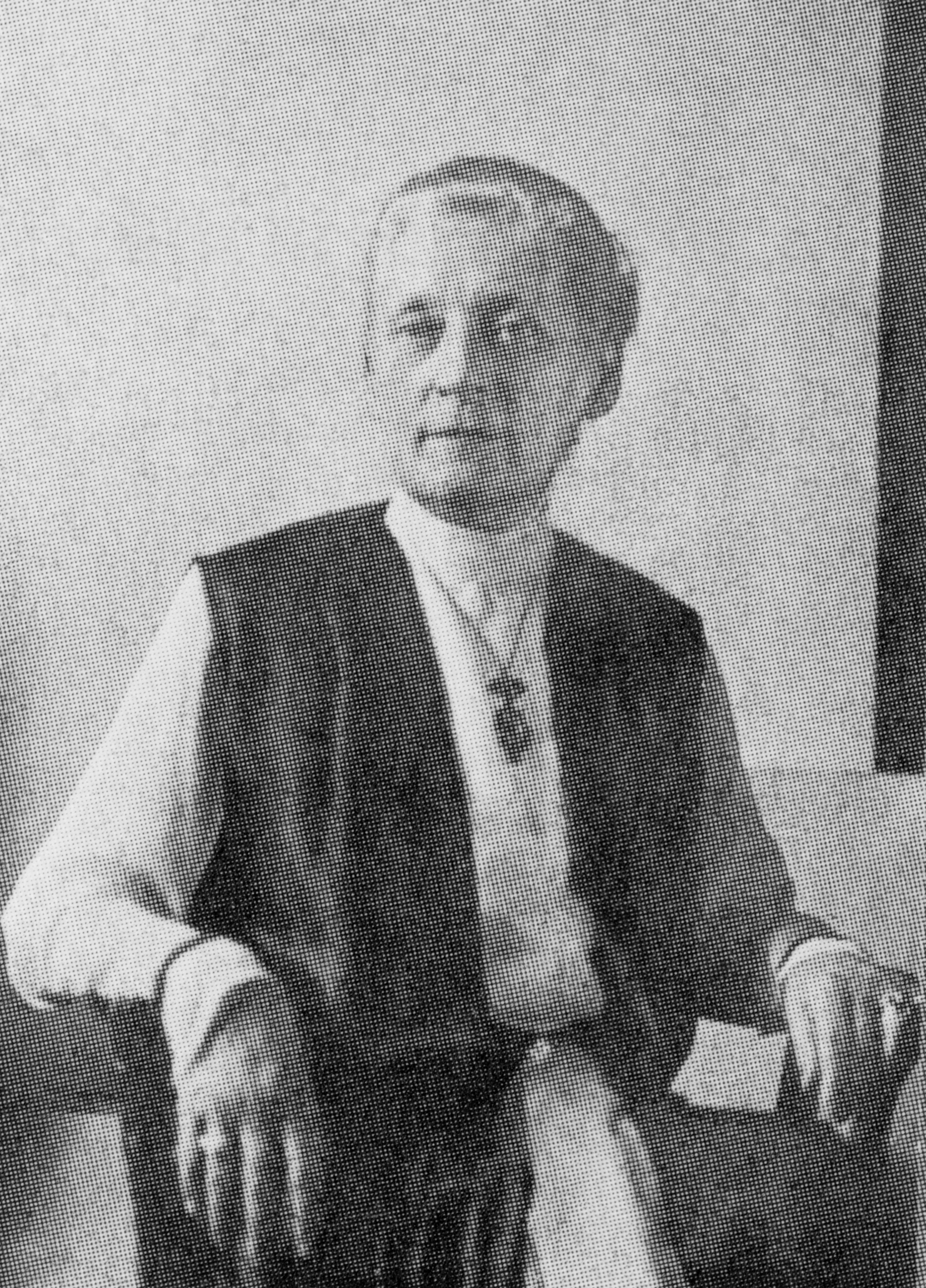
Marie Kundt

Marie Julia Berta Emma Kundt (4 February 1870 – 2 April 1932) was a German photographer and teacher. From 1913 to 1932, she was the director of the photography department of Lette-Verein, an educational establishment for young women, where she broke new ground in supporting the development of courses for women wishing to become medical assistants.
