= Curvature invariant =

Scalar quantities representing curvature

In Riemannian geometry and pseudo-Riemannian geometry, curvature invariants are scalar quantities constructed from tensors that describe the curvature of a space or spacetime. Because they are scalars, their values do not depend on the coordinate system used, making them useful for comparing the intrinsic curvature of different geometries. These tensors are usually the Riemann tensor, the Weyl tensor, the Ricci tensor and tensors formed from these by the operations of taking dual contractions and covariant differentiations.

== Types of curvature invariants ==
The invariants most often considered are polynomial invariants. These are polynomials constructed from contractions such as traces. Second degree examples are called quadratic invariants, and so forth. Invariants constructed using covariant derivatives up to order n are called n-th order differential invariants.

The Riemann tensor is a multilinear operator of fourth rank acting on tangent vectors. However, it can also be considered a linear operator acting on bivectors, and as such it has a characteristic polynomial, whose coefficients and roots (eigenvalues) are polynomial scalar invariants.

== Physical applications ==
In metric theories of gravitation such as general relativity, curvature scalars play an important role in telling distinct spacetimes apart.

Two of the most basic curvature invariants in general relativity are the Kretschmann scalar

$$R_{abcd} \, R^{abcd}$$

and the Chern–Pontryagin scalar,

$$R_{abcd} \, {{}^\star \!R}^{abcd}$$

These are analogous to two familiar quadratic invariants of the electromagnetic field tensor in classical electromagnetism.

An important unsolved problem in general relativity is to give a basis (and any syzygies) for the zero-th order invariants of the Riemann tensor.

They have limitations because many distinct spacetimes cannot be distinguished on this basis. In particular, so called VSI spacetimes (including pp-waves as well as some other Petrov type N and III spacetimes) cannot be distinguished from Minkowski spacetime using any number of polynomial curvature invariants (of any order).

== See also ==
- Cartan–Karlhede algorithm
- Carminati–McLenaghan invariants
- Curvature invariant (general relativity)
- Ricci decomposition
