= Goldberg–Sachs theorem =

Theorem in general relativity

The Goldberg–Sachs theorem is a result in Einstein's theory of general relativity about vacuum solutions of the Einstein field equations relating the existence of a certain type of congruence with algebraic properties of the Weyl tensor.

More precisely, the theorem states that a vacuum solution of the Einstein field equations will admit a shear-free null geodesic congruence if and only if the Weyl tensor is algebraically special.

The theorem is often used when searching for algebraically special vacuum solutions.

== Shear-Free Rays ==
A ray is a family of geodesic light-like curves. That is tangent vector field $l^a$ is null and geodesic: $l_a l^a = 0$ and $l^b \nabla_b l^a = 0$. At each point, there is a (nonunique) 2D spatial slice of the tangent space orthogonal to $l^a$. It is spanned by a complex null vector $m^a$ and its complex conjugate $\bar{m}^a$. If the metric is time positive, then the metric projected on the slice is $\tilde{g}^{ab} = -m^a \bar{m}^b - \bar{m}^a m^b$. Goldberg and Sachs considered the projection of the gradient on this slice.

$A^{ab} = \tilde{g}^{ap} \tilde{g}^{bq} \nabla_p l_q = z \bar{m}^a m^b + \bar{z} m^a \bar{m}^b + \bar{\sigma} m^a m^b + \sigma \bar{m}^a\bar{m}^b.$

A ray is shear-free if $\sigma=0$. Intuitively, this means a small shadow cast by the ray will preserve its shape. The shadow may rotate and grow/shrink, but it will not be distorted.

== The Theorem ==
A vacuum metric, $R_{ab}=0$, is algebraically special if and only if it contains a shear-free null geodesic congruence; the tangent vector obeys $k_{[a}C_{b]ijc}k^ik^j=0$.

This is the theorem originally stated by Goldberg and Sachs. While they stated it in terms of tangent vectors and the Weyl tensor, the proof is much simpler in terms of spinors. The Newman-Penrose field equations give a natural framework for investigating Petrov classifications, since instead of proving $k_{[a}C_{b]ijc}k^ik^j=0$, one can just prove $\Psi_0 = \Psi_1 = 0$. For these proofs, assume we have a spin frame with $o^A$ having its flagpole aligned with the shear-free ray $l^a$.

Proof that a shear-free ray implies algebraic specialty: If a ray is geodesic and shear-free, then $\varepsilon + \bar{\varepsilon} = \kappa= \sigma = 0$. A complex rotation $o^A \rightarrow e^{i\theta} o^A$ does not affect $l^a$ and can set $\varepsilon=0$ to simplify calculations. The first useful NP equation is $D \sigma - \delta \kappa = 0$, which immediately gives $\Psi_0=0$.

To show that $\Psi_1=0$, apply the commutator $\delta D - D \delta$ to it. The Bianchi identity gives the needed formulae: $D \Psi_1 = 4 \rho \Psi_1$ and $\delta \Psi_1 = (2 \beta +4 \tau) \Psi_1$. Working through the algebra of this commutator will show $\Psi_1^2 = 0$, which completes this part of the proof.

Proof that algebraic specialty implies a shear-free ray: Suppose $o_A$ is a degenerate factor of $\Psi_{ABCD}$. While this degeneracy could be n-fold (n=2,3,4) and the proof will be functionally the same, take it to be a 2-fold degeneracy. Then the projection $o^Bo^Co^D \Psi_{ABCD} = 0$. The Bianchi identity in a vacuum spacetime is $\nabla^{AA'}\Psi_{ABCD} = 0$, so applying a derivative to the projection will give $o_A o_B \nabla^{AA'}o^B =0$, which is equivalent to $\kappa = \sigma = 0.$ The congruence is therefore shear-free and almost geodesic: $D l_a = (\varepsilon+\bar{\varepsilon}) l_a$. A suitable rescaling of $o^A$ exists which will make this congruence geodesic, and thus a shear-free ray. The shear of a vector field is invariant under rescaling, so it will remain shear-free.

== Importance and Examples ==
In Petrov type D spacetimes, there are two algebraic degeneracies. By the Goldberg-Sachs theorem there are then two shear-free rays which point along these degenerate directions. Since the Newman-Penrose equations are written in a basis with two real null vectors, there is a natural basis which simplifies the field equations. Examples of such vacuum spacetimes are the Schwarzschild metric and the Kerr metric, which describes a nonrotating and a rotating black hole, respectively. It is precisely this algebraic simplification which makes solving for the Kerr metric possible by hand.

In the Schwarzschild case with time-symmetric coordinates, the two shear-free rays are
$l^\mu\partial_\mu = \pm\left(1 - \frac{2M}{r} \right)^{-1} \partial_t + \partial_r.$

Under the coordinate transformation $(t,r,\theta,\varphi) \rightarrow (t\mp r^* , r,\theta, \varphi)$ where $r^*$ is the tortoise coordinate, this simplifies to $l^\mu \partial_\mu = \partial_r$.

== Linearised gravity ==
It has been shown by Dain and Moreschi that a corresponding theorem will not hold in linearized gravity, that is, given a solution of the linearised Einstein field equations admitting a shear-free null congruence, then this solution need not be algebraically special.

== See also ==
- Geodesic
- Optical scalars
