= Monochromatic electromagnetic plane wave =

In general relativity, the monochromatic electromagnetic plane wave spacetime is the analog of the monochromatic plane waves known from Maxwell's theory. The precise definition of the solution is quite complicated but very instructive.

Any exact solution of the Einstein field equation which models an electromagnetic field, must take into account all gravitational effects of the energy and mass of the electromagnetic field. Besides the electromagnetic field, if no matter and non-gravitational fields are present, the Einstein field equation and the Maxwell field equations must be solved simultaneously.

In Maxwell's field theory of electromagnetism, one of the most important types of an electromagnetic field are those representing electromagnetic microwave radiation. Of these, the most important examples are the electromagnetic plane waves, in which the radiation has planar wavefronts moving in a specific direction at the speed of light. Of these, the most basic is the monochromatic plane waves, in which only one frequency component is present. This is precisely the phenomenon that this solution model, but in terms of general relativity.

== Definition of the solution ==
The metric tensor of the unique exact solution modeling a linearly polarized electromagnetic plane wave with amplitude q and frequency ω can be written, in terms of Rosen coordinates, in the form

$$ds^2 = -2 \, du \, dv + C^2\left(\frac{q^2}{\omega^2}, 2\frac{q^2}{\omega^2}, \omega u \right) \, \left( dx^2 + dy^2 \right), \qquad -\infty < v,x,y < \infty, \quad -u_0 < u < u_0.$$

where $\xi=\frac{u_0}{\omega}$ is the first positive root of C(a, 2a, ξ) = 0 where $a=\frac{q^2}{\omega^2}$. In this chart, ∂_{u}, ∂_{v} are null coordinate vectors while ∂_{x}, ∂_{y} are spacelike coordinate vectors.

Here, the Mathieu cosine C(a, b, ξ) is an even function which solves the Mathieu equation and also takes the value C(a, b, 0) = 1. Despite the name, this function is not periodic, and it cannot be written in terms of sinusoidal or even hypergeometric functions. (See Mathieu function for more about the Mathieu cosine function.)

In the expression for the metric, note that ∂_{u}, ∂_{v} are null vector fields. Therefore, ∂_{u} + ∂_{v} is a timelike vector field, while ∂_{u} − ∂_{v}, ∂_{x}, ∂_{y} are spacelike vector fields.

To define the electromagnetic field vector potential, one may take the electromagnetic four-vector potential

$$\vec{A}=\frac{\sqrt{2} a \int C\left(\frac{u^2}{\omega^2}, \frac{q^2}{2\omega^2}, \omega u \right) \, \sin(\omega u) \, du }{C\left( \frac{q^2}{\omega^2}, \frac{q^2}{2\omega^2}, \omega u \right)} \; \partial_x$$

This is the complete specification of a mathematical model formulated in general relativity.

== Local isometries ==
Our spacetime is modeled by a Lorentzian manifold which has some remarkable symmetries. Namely, our spacetime admits a six-dimensional Lie group of self-isometries. This group is generated by a six-dimensional Lie algebra of Killing vector fields. A convenient basis consists of one null vector field,

$$\vec{\xi}_1 = \partial_v$$

three spacelike vector fields,

$$\vec{\xi}_2 = \partial_x, \; \vec{\xi}_3 = \partial_y, \; \vec{\xi}_4 = -y \, \partial_x + x \, \partial_y$$

and two additional vector fields,

$$\begin{align}
\vec{\xi}_5 &= x \, \partial_v + \int \frac {du} { C \left( \frac{q^2}{\omega^2}, \frac{q^2}{2\omega^2}, \omega u \right) } \, \partial_x \\
\vec{\xi}_6 &= y \, \partial_v + \int \frac {du} { C \left( \frac{q^2}{\omega^2}, \frac{q^2}{2\omega^2}, \omega u \right) } \, \partial_y
\end{align}$$

Here, $\vec{\xi}_2, \, \vec{\xi}_3, \, \vec{\xi}_4$ generate the Euclidean group, acting within each planar wavefront, which justifies the name plane wave for this solution. Also $\vec{\xi}_5, \, \vec{\xi}_6$ show that all non transverse directions are equivalent. This corresponds to the fact that in flat spacetime, two colliding plane waves always collide head-on when represented in the appropriate Lorentz framework.

For future reference, note that this six-dimensional group of self-isometries acts transitively so that our spacetime is homogeneous. However, it is not isotropic, since the transverse directions are distinguished from the non-transverse ones.

== A family of inertial observers ==
The frame field

$$\vec{e}_0 = \frac{1}{\sqrt{2}} \left( \partial_u + \partial_v \right)$$
$$\vec{e}_1 = \frac{1}{\sqrt{2}} \left( -\partial_u + \partial_v \right)$$
$$\vec{e}_2 = \frac{1}{C\left(\frac{q^2}{\omega^2}, \, \frac{2q^2}{\omega^2}, \, \omega u \right)} \partial_x$$
$$\vec{e}_3 = \frac{1}{C\left(\frac{q^2}{\omega^2}, \, \frac{2q^2}{\omega^2}, \, \omega u \right)} \partial_y$$

represents the local Lorentz frame defined by a family of nonspinning inertial observers. That is,

$$\nabla_{\vec{e}_0} \vec{e}_0 = 0$$

which means that the integral curves of the timelike unit vector field e_{0} are timelike geodesics, and also

$$\nabla_{\vec{e}_0} \vec{e}_1 = \nabla_{\vec{e}_0} \vec{e}_2 = \nabla_{\vec{e}_0} \vec{e}_3 = 0$$

which means that the spacelike unit vector fields e_{1}, e_{2}, e_{3} are nonspinning. (They are Fermi–Walker transported.) Here, $\vec{e}_0$ is a timelike unit vector field, while $\vec{e}_1, \vec{e}_2, \vec{e}_3$ are spacelike unit vector fields.

Nonspinning inertial frames are as close as one can come in curved spacetimes to the usual Lorentz frameworks known from special relativity, where Lorentz transformations are simply changes from one Lorentz framework to another.

== The electromagnetic field ==
Concerning our frame, the electromagnetic field obtained from the potential given above is

$$\vec{E} =  q \, \sin(\omega u) \, \vec{e}_2$$
$$\vec{B} = -q \, \sin(\omega u) \, \vec{e}_3$$

This electromagnetic field is a source-free solution of the Maxwell field equations on the particular curved spacetime defined by the metric tensor above. It is a null solution, and it represents a transverse sinusoidal electromagnetic plane wave with amplitude q and frequency ω, traveling in the e_{1} direction. When one

- computes the stress–energy tensor T^{ab} for the given electromagnetic field,
- compute the Einstein tensor G^{ab} for the given metric tensor,

one finds that the Einstein field equation G^{ab} = 8πT^{ab} is satisfied. This is what is meant by saying that there is an exact electrovacuum solution.

In terms of our frame, the stress-energy tensor turns out to be

$$T^{\hat{j} \hat{k}} = \frac{q^2 \sin^2(\omega u)}{4 \pi} \begin{bmatrix} 1&1&0&0\\1&1&0&0\\0&0&0&0\\0&0&0&0 \end{bmatrix}$$

This is the same expression that one would find in classical electromagnetism (where one neglects the gravitational effects of the electromagnetic field energy) for the null field given above; the only difference is that now our frame is a anholonomic (orthonormal) basis on a curved spacetime, rather than a coordinate basis in flat spacetime. (See frame fields.)

== Relative motion of the observers ==
The Rosen chart is said to be comoving with our family of inertial nonspinning observers, because the coordinates ve − u, x, y are all constant along each world line, given by an integral curve of the timelike unit vector field $\vec{X} = \vec{e}_0$. Thus, in the Rosen chart, these observers might appear to be motionless. But in fact, they are in relative motion concerning one another. To see this, one should compute their expansion tensor concerning the frame given above. This turns out to be

$$\theta[\vec{X}]_{\hat{i} \hat{j}} = \frac{\omega}{\sqrt{2}} \, \frac{C^\prime( \frac{q^2}{\omega^2}, \frac{q^2}{2 \omega^2}, \omega u)}{C( \frac{q^2}{\omega^2}, \frac{q^2}{2 \omega^2}, \omega u)} \, \operatorname{diag} (0,1,1)$$

where

$$C^\prime(a,q,\xi) = \frac{\partial C(a,q,\xi)}{\partial \xi}.$$

The nonvanishing components are identical and are

1. concave down on $-u_0 < u < u_0$
2. vanish at u = 0.

Physically, this means that a small spherical 'cloud' of our inertial observers hovers momentarily at u = 0 and then begin to collapse, eventually passing through one another at u = u_{0}. If one imagines them as forming a three-dimensional cloud of uniformly distributed test particles, this collapse occurs orthogonal to the direction of propagation of the wave. The cloud exhibits no relative motion in the direction of propagation, so this is a purely transverse motion.

For $\frac{q}{\omega} \ll 1$ (the shortwave approximation), one has approximately

$$g_{xx} \approx \cos(q u)^2$$
$\theta[\vec{X}]_{22} \approx -q \, \tan(q u)$ For example, with $q=1/2, \omega=5$, one has

where the exact expressions are plotted in red and the shortwave approximations in green.

The vorticity tensor of our congruence vanishes identically, so the world lines of our observers are hypersurface orthogonal. The three-dimensional Riemann tensor of the hyperslices is given, concerning our frame, by

$${{}^3 R}_{1212} = {{}^3 R}_{1313} = q^2 \, \sin(\omega u)^2$$
$${{}^3 R}_{2323} = \frac{-\omega^2}{2} \, \frac{C^\prime \left( \frac{q^2}{\omega^2}, \frac{q^2}{2\omega^2}, \omega u \right)^2}{C\left( \frac{q^2}{\omega^2}, \frac{q^2}{2\omega^2}, \omega u \right)^2}$$

The curvature splits neatly into wave (the sectional curvatures parallel to the direction of propagation) and background (the transverse sectional curvature).

== The Riemann curvature tensor ==
In contrast, the Bel decomposition of the Riemann curvature tensor, taken with respect to $\vec{X} = \vec{e}_0$, is simplicity itself. The electrogravitic tensor, which directly represents the tidal accelerations, is

$$E[\vec{X}]_{\hat{m} \hat{n}} = q^2 \, \sin(\omega u)^2 \, \operatorname{diag} (0,1,1)$$

The magnetogravitic tensor, which directly represents the spin-spin force on a gyroscope carried by one of our observers, is

$$B[\vec{X}]_{\hat{m} \hat{n}} = q^2 \, \sin(\omega u)^2 \begin{bmatrix} 0&0&0\\0&0&-1\\0&1&0 \end{bmatrix}$$

(The topogravitic tensor, which represents the spatial sectional curvatures, agrees with the electrogravitic tensor.)

Looking back at our graph of the metric tensor, one can see that the tidal tensor produces small sinusoidal relative accelerations with period ω, which are purely transverse to the direction of propagation of the wave. The net gravitational effect over many periods is to produce an expansion and recollapse cycle of our family of inertial nonspinning observers. This can be considered the effect of the wave's background curvature produced.

This expansion and recollapse cycle is reminiscent of the expanding and recollapsing FRW cosmological models, and it occurs for a similar reason: the presence of nongravitational mass-energy. In the FRW models, this mass energy is due to the mass of the dust particles; here, it is due to the field energy of the electromagnetic wave field. There, the expansion-recollapse cycle begins and ends with a strong scalar curvature singularity; here, there is a mere coordinate singularity (a circumstance which much confused Einstein and Rosen in 1937). In addition, there is a small sinusoidal modulation of the expansion and recollapse.

== Optical effects ==
A general principle concerning plane waves states that one cannot see the wave train enter the station, but one can see it leave. That is, if one looks through oncoming wavefronts at distant objects, one will see no optical distortion, but if one turns and look through departing wavefronts at distant objects, one will see optical distortions. Specifically, the null geodesic congruence generated by the null vector field $\vec{k} = \vec{e}_0 + \vec{e}_1$ has vanishing optical scalars, but the null geodesic congruence generated by $\vec{\ell} = \vec{e}_0 - \vec{e}_1$ has vanishing twist and shear scalars but nonvanishing expansion scalar

$$\theta = \sqrt{2} \omega \, \frac{C^\prime \left( \frac{q^2}{\omega^2},\frac{q^2}{2 \omega^2},\omega u \right)}{C \left(\frac{q^2}{\omega^2}, \frac{q^2}{2 \omega^2}, \omega u \right)}$$

This shows that when looking through departing wavefronts at distant objects, our inertial nonspinning observers will see their apparent size change in the same way as the expansion of the timelike geodesic congruence itself.

== The Brinkmann chart ==
One way to quickly see the plausibility of the assertion that u = u_{0} is a mere coordinate singularity is to recall that our spacetime is homogeneous, so that all events are equivalent. To confirm this directly, and to study from a different perspective the relative motion of our inertial nonspinning observers, one can apply the coordinate transformation

$$u \to u$$
$$v \to v - \frac{\dot{r}}{2r} \left (x^2+y^2 \right )$$
$$x \to x/r$$
$$y \to y/r$$

where

$$-\frac{\ddot{r}(u)}{r(u)} = q \sin(\omega u)^2$$

This brings the solution into its representation in terms of Brinkmann coordinates:

$$ds^2 = -q \, \sin(\omega u)^2 \, du^2 - 2 \, du \, dv + dx^2 + dy^2, \qquad -\infty < u,v,x,y < \infty$$

Since it can be shown that the new coordinates are geodesically complete, the Brinkmann coordinates define a global coordinate chart. In this chart, one can see that an infinite sequence of identical expansion-recollapse cycles occurs!

== Caustics ==
In the Brinkmann chart, our frame field becomes rather complicated:

$$\vec{e}_0 = \frac{\partial_u + \partial_v}{\sqrt{2}} + \left \{ \frac{x^2+y^2}{\sqrt{2}} \left( -q^2 \sin(\omega u)^2 + \frac{\omega^2}{2} \, \frac{C^\prime \left(\frac{q^2}{\omega^2}, \frac{q^2}{2 \omega^2}, \omega u \right)^2}{C \left(\frac{q^2}{\omega^2}, \frac{q^2}{2\omega^2}, \omega u \right)^2} \right) \partial_v\right \} + \left \{\frac{\omega}{2} \frac{C^\prime \left(\frac{q^2}{\omega^2}, \frac{q^2}{2 \omega^2}, \omega u \right)}{C \left( \frac{q^2}{\omega^2}, \frac{q^2}{2 \omega^2}, \omega u \right)} \left( x \partial_x + y \partial_y \right)\right \}$$

and so forth. Naturally, if one computes the expansion tensor, electrogravitic tensor, and so forth, one would obtain the same answers as before but expressed in the new coordinates.

The simplicity of the metric tensor compared to the complexity of the frame is striking. The point is that one can more easily visualize the caustics formed by the relative motion of our observers in the new chart. The integral curves of the timelike unit geodesic vector field $\vec{X}=\vec{e}_0$ give the world lines of our observers. In the Rosen chart, these appear as vertical coordinate lines, since that chart is comoving.

To understand how this situation appears in the Brinkmann chart, notice that when ω is extensive, our timelike geodesic unit vector field becomes approximately

$$\vec{X} \approx \frac{\partial_u + \partial_v}{\sqrt{2}} - q \tan(qu) \left(x \partial_x + y \partial_y \right)+ \frac{x^2+y^2}{\sqrt{2}} \, \left(-q^2 \sin(\omega u)^2 + q^2 \tan(q u)^2 \right) \partial_v$$

Suppressing the last term, the result is

Approximate motion of our family of observers, as represented in Brinkmann chart

$$\vec{X} \approx \partial_t - q \tan \left (\frac{qu}{\sqrt{2}} \right ) \left( x \partial_x + y \partial_y \right)$$

One immediately obtains an integral curve that exhibits sinusoidal expansion and reconvergence cycles. See the figure, in which time is running vertically and one uses the radial symmetry to suppress one spatial dimension. This figure shows why there is a coordinate singularity in the Rosen chart; the observers must pass by one another at regular intervals, which is incompatible with the comoving property, so the chart breaks down at these places. Note that this figure incorrectly suggests that one observer is the 'center of attraction', as it were, but in fact they are all completely equivalent, due to the large symmetry group of this spacetime. Note too that the broadly sinusoidal relative motion of our observers is fully consistent with the behavior of the expansion tensor (concerning the frame field corresponding to our family of observers) which was noted above.

It is worth noting that these somewhat tricky points confused no less a figure than Albert Einstein in his 1937 paper on gravitational waves (written long before the modern mathematical machinery used here was widely appreciated in physics).

Thus, in the Brinkmann chart, the world lines of our observers, in the shortwave case, are periodic curves that have the form of sinusoidal with period $2 \pi/q$, modulated by much smaller sinusoidal perturbations in the null direction ∂_{v} and having a much shorter period, $2 \pi/\omega$. The observers periodically expand and recollapse transversely to the direct of propagation; this motion is modulated by a short period of small amplitude perturbations.

== Summary ==
Comparing our exact solution with the usual monochromatic electromagnetic plane wave as treated in special relativity (i.e., as a wave in flat spacetime, neglecting the gravitational effects of the energy of the electromagnetic field), one sees that the striking new feature in general relativity is the expansion and collapse cycles experienced by our observers, which one can put down to background curvature, not any measurements made over short times and distances (on the order of the wavelength of the electromagnetic microwave radiation).

== See also ==
- Sticky bead argument, for an account of the 1937 paper by Einstein and Rosen alluded to above.
