= Ozsváth–Schücking metric =

Solution of Einstein field equations

The Ozsváth–Schücking metric, or the Ozsváth–Schücking solution, is a vacuum solution of the Einstein field equations. The metric was published by István Ozsváth and Engelbert Schücking in 1962. It is noteworthy among vacuum solutions for being the first known solution that is stationary, globally defined, and singularity-free but nevertheless not isometric to the Minkowski metric. This stands in contradiction to a claimed strong Mach principle, which would forbid a vacuum solution from being anything but Minkowski without singularities, where the singularities are to be construed as mass as in the Schwarzschild metric.

With coordinates $\{x^0,x^1,x^2,x^3\}$, define the following tetrad:

$$e_{(0)}=\frac{1}{\sqrt{2+(x^3)^2}}\left( x^3\partial_0-\partial_1+\partial_2\right)$$
$$e_{(1)}=\frac{1}{\sqrt{4+2(x^3)^2}}\left[ \left(x^3-\sqrt{2+(x^3)^2}\right)\partial_0+\left(1+(x^3)^2-x^3\sqrt{2+(x^3)^2}\right)\partial_1+\partial_2\right]$$
$$e_{(2)}=\frac{1}{\sqrt{4+2(x^3)^2}}\left[ \left(x^3+\sqrt{2+(x^3)^2}\right)\partial_0+\left(1+(x^3)^2+x^3\sqrt{2+(x^3)^2}\right)\partial_1+\partial_2\right]$$
$$e_{(3)}=\partial_3$$

It is straightforward to verify that e_{(0)} is timelike, e_{(1)}, e_{(2)}, e_{(3)} are spacelike, that they are all orthogonal, and that there are no singularities. The corresponding proper time is

$${d \tau}^{2} = -(dx^0)^2 +4(x^3)(dx^0)(dx^2)-2(dx^1)(dx^2)-2(x^3)^2(dx^2)^2-(dx^3)^2.$$

The Riemann tensor has only one algebraically independent, nonzero component

$$R_{0202}=-1,$$

which shows that the spacetime is Ricci flat but not conformally flat. That is sufficient to conclude that it is a vacuum solution distinct from Minkowski spacetime. Under a suitable coordinate transformation, the metric can be rewritten as

$$d\tau^2 = [(x^2 - y^2) \cos (2u) + 2xy \sin(2u)] du^2 - 2dudv - dx^2 - dy^2$$

and is therefore an example of a pp-wave spacetime.
