= Classification of electromagnetic fields =

In differential geometry and theoretical physics, the classification of electromagnetic fields is a pointwise classification of bivectors at each point of a Lorentzian manifold. It is used in the study of solutions of Maxwell's equations and has applications in Einstein's theory of relativity.

== Classification theorem ==
The electromagnetic field at a point p (i.e. an event) of a Lorentzian spacetime is represented by a real bivector F = F^{ab} defined over the tangent space at p.

The tangent space at p is isometric as a real inner product space to E^{1,3}. That is, it has the same notion of vector magnitude and angle as Minkowski spacetime. To simplify the notation, we will assume the spacetime is Minkowski spacetime. This tends to blur the distinction between the tangent space at p and the underlying manifold; fortunately, nothing is lost by this specialization, for reasons we discuss as the end of the article.

The classification theorem for electromagnetic fields characterizes the bivector F in relation to the Lorentzian metric η = η_{ab} by defining and examining the so-called "principal null directions". Let us explain this.

The bivector F^{ab} yields a skew-symmetric linear operator F^{a}_{b} = F^{ac}η_{cb} defined by lowering one index with the metric. It acts on the tangent space at p by r^{a} → F^{a}_{b}r^{b}. We will use the symbol F to denote either the bivector or the operator, according to context.

We mention a dichotomy drawn from exterior algebra. A bivector that can be written as F = v ∧ w, where v, w are linearly independent, is called simple. Any nonzero bivector over a 4-dimensional vector space either is simple, or can be written as F = v ∧ w + x ∧ y, where v, w, x, and y are linearly independent; the two cases are mutually exclusive. Stated like this, the dichotomy makes no reference to the metric η, only to exterior algebra. But it is easily seen that the associated skew-symmetric linear operator F^{a}_{b} has rank 2 in the former case and rank 4 in the latter case.

To state the classification theorem, we consider the eigenvalue problem for F, that is, the problem of finding eigenvalues λ and eigenvectors r which satisfy the eigenvalue equation

$$F^a{}_br^b = \lambda\, r^a .$$

The skew-symmetry of F implies that:

- either the eigenvector r is a null vector (i.e. η(r,r) = 0), or the eigenvalue λ is zero, or both.

A 1-dimensional subspace generated by a null eigenvector is called a principal null direction of the bivector.

The classification theorem characterizes the possible principal null directions of a bivector. It states that one of the following must hold for any nonzero bivector:

- the bivector has one "repeated" principal null direction; in this case, the bivector itself is said to be null,
- the bivector has two distinct principal null directions; in this case, the bivector is called non-null.

Furthermore, for any non-null bivector, the two eigenvalues associated with the two distinct principal null directions have the same magnitude but opposite sign, λ = ±ν, so we have three subclasses of non-null bivectors:

- spacelike: ν = 0
- timelike : ν ≠ 0 and rank F = 2
- non-simple: ν ≠ 0 and rank F = 4,

where the rank refers to the rank of the linear operator F.

== Physical interpretation ==
The algebraic classification of bivectors given above has an important application in relativistic physics: the electromagnetic field is represented by a skew-symmetric second rank tensor field (the electromagnetic field tensor) so we immediately obtain an algebraic classification of electromagnetic fields.

In a cartesian chart on Minkowski spacetime with metric signature mostly-minus, $(\eta_{\mu\nu}) = \text{diag}(+---)$, the electromagnetic field tensor has components

$$F_{ab} = \left(
\begin{matrix}
0 & B_z & -B_y & E_x/c \\
-B_z & 0 & B_x & E_y/c \\
B_y & -B_x & 0 & E_z/c \\
-E_x/c & -E_y/c & -E_z/c & 0
\end{matrix}
\right)$$

where $E_x, E_y, E_z$ and $B_x, B_y, B_z$ denote respectively the components of the electric and magnetic fields, as measured by an inertial observer (at rest in our coordinates). As usual in relativistic physics, we will find it convenient to work with geometrised units in which $c=1$. In the "Index gymnastics" formalism of special relativity, the Minkowski metric $\eta$ is used to raise and lower indices.

=== Invariants ===
The fundamental invariants of the electromagnetic field are:

$$P \equiv \frac{1}{2} F_{ab} \, F^{ab} = \| \vec{B} \|^2 - \frac{\| \vec{E} \|^2}{c^2} = -\frac{1}{2}{}^* F_{ab} \, {}^* F^{ab}$$
$$Q \equiv \frac{1}{4}  F_{ab} \, {}^*F^{ab} =\frac{1}{8}\epsilon^{abcd}F_{ab}F_{cd}= \frac{\vec{E} \cdot \vec{B}}{c}$$.

(Fundamental means that every other invariant can be expressed in terms of these two.)

A null electromagnetic field is characterised by $P = Q =0$. In this case, the invariants reveal that the electric and magnetic fields are perpendicular and that they are of the same magnitude (in geometrised units). An example of a null field is a plane electromagnetic wave in Minkowski space.

A non-null field is characterised by $P^2+Q^2 \neq \, 0$. If $P \neq 0 = Q$, there exists an inertial reference frame for which either the electric or magnetic field vanishes. (These correspond respectively to magnetostatic and electrostatic fields.) If $Q \neq 0$, there exists an inertial frame in which electric and magnetic fields are proportional.

== Curved Lorentzian manifolds ==
So far we have discussed only Minkowski spacetime. According to the (strong) equivalence principle, if we simply replace "inertial frame" above with a frame field, everything works out exactly the same way on curved manifolds.

== See also ==
- Electrovacuum solution
- Lorentz group
- Bel decomposition
- Petrov classification
- Peeling theorem
- Electromagnetic peeling theorem
