= Bel decomposition =

Topic in semi-Riemannian geometry

In semi-Riemannian geometry, the Bel decomposition, taken with respect to a specific timelike congruence, is a way of breaking up the Riemann tensor of a pseudo-Riemannian manifold into lower order tensors with properties similar to the electric field and magnetic field. Such a decomposition was partially described by Alphonse Matte in 1953 and by Lluis Bel in 1958.

This decomposition is particularly important in general relativity. This is the case of four-dimensional Lorentzian manifolds, for which there are only three pieces with simple properties and individual physical interpretations.

== Decomposition of the Riemann tensor ==
In four dimensions the Bel decomposition of the Riemann tensor, with respect to a timelike unit vector field $\vec{X}$, not necessarily geodesic or hypersurface orthogonal, consists of three pieces:

1. the electrogravitic tensor $E[\vec{X}]_{ab} = R_{ambn} \, X^m \, X^n$
  - Also known as the tidal tensor. It can be physically interpreted as giving the tidal stresses on small bits of a material object (which may also be acted upon by other physical forces), or the tidal accelerations of a small cloud of test particles in a vacuum solution or electrovacuum solution.
2. the magnetogravitic tensor $B[\vec{X}]_{ab} = {{}^\star R}_{ambn} \, X^m \, X^n$
  - Can be interpreted physically as a specifying possible spin-spin forces on spinning bits of matter, such as spinning test particles.
3. the topogravitic tensor $L[\vec{X}]_{ab} = {{}^\star R^\star}_{ambn} \, X^m \, X^n$
  - Can be interpreted as representing the sectional curvatures for the spatial part of a frame field.

Because these are all transverse (i.e. projected to the spatial hyperplane elements orthogonal to our timelike unit vector field), they can be represented as linear operators on three-dimensional vectors, or as three-by-three real matrices. They are respectively symmetric, traceless, and symmetric (6,8,6 linearly independent components, for a total of 20). If we write these operators as E, B, L respectively, the principal invariants of the Riemann tensor are obtained as follows:

- $K_1/4$ is the trace of E^{2} + L^{2} - 2 B B^{T},
- $-K_2/8$ is the trace of B ( E - L ),
- $K_3/8$ is the trace of E L - B^{2}.

== See also ==
- Bel–Robinson tensor
- Ricci decomposition
- Classification of electromagnetic fields § Invariants
- Tidal tensor
- Papapetrou–Dixon equations
- Curvature invariant
- Curvature invariant (general relativity)
