= Tidal tensor =

Tensor in general relativity

In Newton's theory of gravitation and in various relativistic classical theories of gravitation, such as general relativity, the tidal tensor represents:

1. tidal accelerations of a cloud of (electrically neutral, nonspinning) test particles
2. tidal stresses in a small object immersed in an ambient gravitational field

The tidal tensor describes the relative acceleration due to gravity between two test masses separated by an infinitesimal distance. The component $\Phi_{ab}$ represents the relative acceleration in the $\hat{a}$ direction produced by a displacement in the $\hat{b}$ direction.

== Tidal tensor for a spherical body ==
The most common example of tides is the tidal force around a spherical body (e.g., a planet or a moon). Here we compute the tidal tensor for the gravitational field outside an isolated spherically symmetric massive object. According to Newton's gravitational law, the acceleration a at a distance r from a central mass m is

$$a = -Gm/r^2$$

(to simplify the math, in the following derivations we use the convention of setting the gravitational constant G to one. To calculate the differential accelerations, the results are to be multiplied by G.)

Let us adopt the frame in polar coordinates for our three-dimensional Euclidean space, and consider infinitesimal displacements in the radial and azimuthal directions, $\partial_r, \partial_\theta,$ and $\partial_\phi$, which are given the subscripts 1, 2, and 3 respectively.

$$\vec{\epsilon}_1 = \partial_r, \; \vec{\epsilon}_2 = \frac{1}{r} \, \partial_\theta, \; \vec{\epsilon}_3 = \frac{1}{r \sin \theta} \, \partial_\phi$$

We will directly compute each component of the tidal tensor, expressed in this frame. First, compare the gravitational forces on two nearby objects lying on the same radial line at distances from the central body differing by a distance h:

$$m/(r+h)^2 - m/r^2 = -2mh/r^3 + 3mh^2/r^4 + O(h^3)$$

Because in discussing tensors we are dealing with multilinear algebra, we retain only first order terms, so $\Phi_{11} = -2m/r^3$. Since there is no acceleration in the $\theta$ or $\phi$ direction due to a displacement in the radial direction, the other radial terms are zero: $\Phi_{12} = \Phi_{13} = 0$.

Similarly, we can compare the gravitational force on two nearby observers lying at the same radius $r = r_0$ but displaced by an (infinitesimal) distance h in the $\theta$ or $\phi$ direction. Using some elementary trigonometry and the small angle approximation, we find that the force vectors differ by a vector tangent to the sphere which has magnitude

$$\frac{m}{r_0^2} \, \sin(\theta) \approx \frac{m}{r_0^2} \, \frac{h}{r_0} = \frac{m}{r_0^3} \, h$$

By using the small angle approximation, we have ignored all terms of order $O(h^2)$, so the tangential components are $\Phi_{22} = \Phi_{33} = m/r^3$. Again, since there is no acceleration in the radial direction due to displacements in either of the azimuthal directions, the other azimuthal terms are zero: $\Phi_{21} = \Phi_{31} = 0$.

Combining this information, we find that the tidal tensor is diagonal with frame components $\Phi_{\hat{a}\hat{b}} = \frac{m}{r^3}\operatorname{diag}(-2,1,1)$ This is the Coulomb form characteristic of spherically symmetric central force fields in Newtonian physics.

== Hessian formulation ==
In the more general case where the mass is not a single spherically symmetric central object, the tidal tensor can be derived from the gravitational potential $U$, which obeys the Poisson equation:

$$\Delta U = 4 \pi \, \mu$$

where $\mu$ is the mass density of any matter present, and where $\Delta$ is the Laplace operator. Note that this equation implies that in a vacuum solution, the potential is simply a harmonic function.

The tidal tensor is given by the traceless part

$$\Phi_{ab} = J_{ab} - \frac{1}{3} \, {J^m}_m \, \eta_{ab}$$

of the Hessian

$$J_{ab} = \frac{\partial^2 U}{\partial x^a \, \partial x^b}$$

where we are using the standard Cartesian chart for E^{3}, with the Euclidean metric tensor

$$ds^2 = dx^2 + dy^2 + dz^2, \; -\infty < x,y,z < \infty$$

Using standard results in vector calculus, this is readily converted to expressions valid in other coordinate charts, such as the polar spherical chart

$$ds^2 = d\rho^2 + \rho^2 \, \left( d\theta^2 + \sin(\theta)^2 \, d\phi^2 \right)$$
$$0 < \rho < \infty, \; 0 < \theta < \pi, \; -\pi < \phi < \pi$$

=== Spherically symmetric field ===
As an example, we can calculate the tidal tensor for a spherical body using the Hessian. Next, let us plug the gravitational potential $U = -m/\rho$ into the Hessian. We can convert the expression above to one valid in polar spherical coordinates, or we can convert the potential to Cartesian coordinates before plugging in. Adopting the second course, we have $U = -m/\sqrt{x^2+y^2+z^2}$, which gives

$$\Phi_{ab} = \frac{m}{(x^2+y^2+z^2)^{5/2}} \, \left[ \begin{matrix} y^2+z^2-2x^2 & -3xy & -3xz \\ -3xy & x^2+z^2-2y^2 & -3yz \\ -3xz & -3yz & x^2+y^2-2z^2 \end{matrix} \right]$$

After a rotation of our frame, which is adapted to the polar spherical coordinates, this expression agrees with our previous result. The easiest way to see this is to set $y,z$ to zero so that the off-diagonal terms vanish and $\rho=x$, and then invoke the spherical symmetry.

== In General Relativity ==
In general relativity, the tidal tensor is generalized by the Riemann curvature tensor. In the weak-field limit, the tidal tensor is given by the components $\Phi_{ij} = R_{i0j0}$ of the curvature tensor.

== See also ==
- Tidal force
- Stress tensor
