= Peeling theorem =

Theorem describing tensor behavior

In general relativity, the peeling theorem describes the asymptotic behavior of the Weyl tensor as one goes to null infinity. Let $\gamma$ be a null geodesic in a spacetime $(M, g_{ab})$ from a point p to null infinity, with affine parameter $\lambda$. Then the theorem states that, as $\lambda$ tends to infinity:

$$C_{abcd} = \frac{C^{(1)}_{abcd}}{\lambda}+\frac{C^{(2)}_{abcd}}{\lambda^2}+\frac{C^{(3)}_{abcd}}{\lambda^3}+\frac{C^{(4)}_{abcd}}{\lambda^4}+O\left(\frac{1}{\lambda^5}\right)$$

where $C_{abcd}$ is the Weyl tensor, and abstract index notation is used. Moreover, in the Petrov classification, $C^{(1)}_{abcd}$ is type N, $C^{(2)}_{abcd}$ is type III, $C^{(3)}_{abcd}$ is type II (or II-II) and $C^{(4)}_{abcd}$ is type I.
