= Electrovacuum solution =

Mathematical solution in general relativity

In general relativity, an electrovacuum solution (electrovacuum) is an exact solution of the Einstein field equation in which the only nongravitational mass–energy present is the field energy of an electromagnetic field, which must satisfy the (curved-spacetime) source-free Maxwell equations appropriate to the given geometry. For this reason, electrovacuums are sometimes called (source-free) Einstein–Maxwell solutions.

== Definition ==
In general relativity, the geometric setting for physical phenomena is a Lorentzian manifold, which is interpreted as a curved spacetime, and which is specified by defining a metric tensor $g_{ab}$ (or by defining a frame field). The Riemann curvature tensor $R_{abcd}$ of this manifold and associated quantities such as the Einstein tensor $G^{ab}$, are well-defined. In general relativity, they can be interpreted as geometric manifestations (curvature and forces) of the gravitational field.

We also need to specify an electromagnetic field by defining an electromagnetic field tensor $F_{ab}$ on our Lorentzian manifold. To be classified as an electrovacuum solution, these two tensors are required to satisfy two following conditions

1. The electromagnetic field tensor must satisfy the source-free curved spacetime Maxwell field equations $\, F_{ab;c} + F_{bc;a} + F_{ca;b} = 0$ and ${F^{jb}}_{;j} = 0$
2. The Einstein tensor must match the electromagnetic stress–energy tensor, $\textstyle G^{ab}= 2 ( F^{a}{}_{j}F^{bj}-\frac{1}{4}g^{ab} F^{mn} \, F_{mn} )$.

The first Maxwell equation is satisfied automatically if we define the field tensor in terms of an electromagnetic potential vector $\vec{A}$. In terms of the dual covector (or potential one-form) and the electromagnetic two-form, we can do this by setting $F = dA$. Then we need only ensure that the divergences vanish (i.e. that the second Maxwell equation is satisfied for a source-free field) and that the electromagnetic stress–energy matches the Einstein tensor.

== Invariants ==
The electromagnetic field tensor is antisymmetric, with only two algebraically independent scalar invariants,

$$I = \star ( F \wedge \star F ) = F_{ab} \, F^{ab} = -2 \, \left ( \| \vec{E} \|^2 - \|\vec{B} \|^2 \right)$$
$$J = \star (F \wedge F) = F_{ab} \, {\star F}^{ab} = -4 \, \vec{E} \cdot \vec{B}$$

Here, the star is the Hodge star operator.

Using these, we can classify the possible electromagnetic fields as follows:

1. If $I < 0$ but $J = 0$, we have an electrostatic field, which means that some observers will measure a static electric field, and no magnetic field.
2. If $I > 0$ but $J = 0$, we have an magnetostatic field, which means that some observers will measure a static magnetic field, and no electric field.
3. If $I = J = 0$, the electromagnetic field is said to be null, and we have a null electrovacuum.

Null electrovacuums are associated with electromagnetic radiation. An electromagnetic field which is not null is called non-null, and then we have a non-null electrovacuum.

== Einstein tensor ==
The components of a tensor computed with respect to a frame field rather than the coordinate basis are often called physical components, because these are the components which can (in principle) be measured by an observer.

In the case of an electrovacuum solution, an adapted frame

$$\vec{e}_0, \; \vec{e}_1, \; \vec{e}_2,  \; \vec{e}_3$$

can always be found in which the Einstein tensor has a particularly simple appearance. Here, the first vector is understood to be a timelike unit vector field; this is everywhere tangent to the world lines of the corresponding family of adapted observers, whose motion is "aligned" with the electromagnetic field. The last three are spacelike unit vector fields.

For a non-null electrovacuum, an adapted frame can be found in which the Einstein tensor takes the form

$$G^{\hat{a}\hat{b}} = 8 \pi \epsilon \, \left[ \begin{matrix} 1&0&0&0\\0&1&0&0\\0&0&1&0\\0&0&0&-1\end{matrix} \right]$$

where $\epsilon$ is the energy density of the electromagnetic field, as measured by any adapted observer. From this expression, it is easy to see that the isotropy group of our non-null electrovacuum is generated by boosts in the $\vec{e}_3$ direction and rotations about the $\vec{e}_3$ axis. In other words, the isotropy group of any non-null electrovacuum is a two-dimensional abelian Lie group isomorphic to SO(1,1) x SO(2).

For a null electrovacuum, an adapted frame can be found in which the Einstein tensor takes the form

$$G^{\hat{a}\hat{b}} = 8 \pi \epsilon \, \left[ \begin{matrix} 1&0&0&\pm 1\\ 0&0&0&0\\0&0&0&0\\ \pm 1 &0&0&1\end{matrix} \right]$$

From this it is easy to see that the isotropy group of our null electrovacuum includes rotations about the $\vec{e}_3$ axis; two further generators are the two parabolic Lorentz transformations aligned with the $\vec{e}_3$ direction given in the article on the Lorentz group. In other words, the isotropy group of any null electrovacuum is a three-dimensional Lie group isomorphic to E(2), the isometry group of the euclidean plane.

The fact that these results are exactly the same in curved spacetimes as for electrodynamics in flat Minkowski spacetime is one expression of the equivalence principle.

== Eigenvalues ==
The characteristic polynomial of the Einstein tensor of a non-null electrovacuum must have the form

$$\chi(\lambda) = \left( \lambda + 8 \pi \epsilon \right)^2 \, \left( \lambda - 8 \pi \epsilon \right)^2$$

Using Newton's identities, this condition can be re-expressed in terms of the traces of the powers of the Einstein tensor as

$$t_1 = t_3 = 0, \; t_4 = {t_2}^2/4$$

where

$$t_1 = G^a{}_a, \; t_2 = G^a{}_b \, G^b{}_a, \; t_3 = G^a{}_b \, G^b{}_c \, G^c{}_a, \; t_4 = G^a{}_b \, G^b{}_c \, G^c{}_d \, G^d{}_a$$

This necessary criterion can be useful for checking that a putative non-null electrovacuum solution is plausible, and is sometimes useful for finding non-null electrovacuum solutions.

The characteristic polynomial of a null electrovacuum vanishes identically, even if the energy density is nonzero. This possibility is a tensor analogue of the well known that a null vector always has vanishing length, even if it is not the zero vector. Thus, every null electrovacuum has one quadruple eigenvalue, namely zero.

== Rainich conditions ==
In 1925, George Yuri Rainich presented purely mathematical conditions which are both necessary and sufficient for a Lorentzian manifold to admit an interpretation in general relativity as a non-null electrovacuum. These comprise three algebraic conditions and one differential condition. The conditions are sometimes useful for checking that a putative non-null electrovacuum really is what it claims, or even for finding such solutions.

Analogous necessary and sufficient conditions for a null electrovacuum have been found by Charles Torre.

== Test fields ==
Sometimes one can assume that the field energy of any electromagnetic field is so small that its gravitational effects can be neglected. Then, to obtain an approximate electrovacuum solution, we need only solve the Maxwell equations on a given vacuum solution. In this case, the electromagnetic field is often called a test field, in analogy with the term test particle (denoting a small object whose mass is too small to contribute appreciably to the ambient gravitational field).

Here, it is useful to know that any Killing vectors which may be present will (in the case of a vacuum solution) automatically satisfy the curved spacetime Maxwell equations.

Note that this procedure amounts to assuming that the electromagnetic field, but not the gravitational field, is "weak". Sometimes we can go even further; if the gravitational field is also considered "weak", we can independently solve the linearised Einstein field equations and the (flat spacetime) Maxwell equations on a Minkowksi vacuum background. Then the (weak) metric tensor gives the approximate geometry; the Minkowski background is unobservable by physical means, but mathematically much simpler to work with, whenever we can get away with such a sleight-of-hand.

== Examples ==
Noteworthy individual non-null electrovacuum solutions include:

- Reissner–Nordström electrovacuum (which describes the geometry around a charged spherical mass),
- Kerr–Newman electrovacuum (which describes the geometry around a charged, rotating object),
- Melvin electrovacuum (a model of a cylindrically symmetric magnetostatic field),
- Garfinkle–Melvin electrovacuum (like the preceding, but including a gravitational wave traveling along the axis of symmetry),
- Bertotti–Robinson electrovacuum: this is a simple spacetime having a remarkable product structure; it arises from a kind of "blow up" of the horizon of the Reissner–Nordström electrovacuum,
- Witten electrovacuums (discovered by Louis Witten).

Noteworthy individual null electrovacuum solutions include:

- the monochromatic electromagnetic plane wave, an exact solution which is the general relativitistic analogue of the plane waves in classical electromagnetism,
- Bell–Szekeres electrovacuum (a colliding plane wave model).

Some well known families of electrovacuums are:

- Weyl–Maxwell electrovacuums: this is the family of all static axisymmetric electrovacuum solutions; it includes the Reissner–Nordström electrovacuum,
- Ernst–Maxwell electrovacuums: this is the family of all stationary axisymmetric electrovacuum solutions; it includes the Kerr–Newman electrovacuum,
- Beck–Maxwell electrovacuums: all nonrotating cylindrically symmetric electrovacuum solutions,
- Ehlers–Maxwell electrovacuums: all stationary cylindrically symmetric electrovacuum solutions,
- Szekeres electrovacuums: all pairs of colliding plane waves, where each wave may contain both gravitational and electromagnetic radiation; these solutions are null electrovacuums outside the interaction zone, but generally non-null electrovacuums inside the interaction zone, due to the non-linear interaction of the two waves after they collide.

Many pp-wave spacetimes admit an electromagnetic field tensor turning them into exact null electrovacuum solutions.

== See also ==
- Classification of electromagnetic fields
- Exact solutions in general relativity
- Lorentz group
