= Segre classification =

Algebraic classification of rank two symmetric tensors

The Segre classification is an algebraic classification of rank two symmetric tensors. It was proposed by the Italian mathematician Corrado Segre in 1884.

The resulting types are then known as Segre types. It is most commonly applied to the energy–momentum tensor (or the Ricci tensor) and primarily finds application in the classification of exact solutions in general relativity.

== See also ==
- Corrado Segre
- Jordan normal form
- Petrov classification
