= Test particle =

In physical theories, a test particle, or test charge, is an idealized model of an object whose physical properties (usually mass, charge, or size) are assumed to be negligible except for the property being studied, which is considered to be insufficient to alter the behaviour of the rest of the system. The concept of a test particle often simplifies problems, and can provide a good approximation for physical phenomena. In addition to its uses in the simplification of the dynamics of a system in particular limits, it is also used as a diagnostic in computer simulations of physical processes.

== Electrostatics ==
In simulations with electric fields the most important characteristics of a test particle is its electric charge and its mass. In this situation it is often referred to as a test charge.

The electric field created by a point charge q is

$$\textbf{E} = \frac{q \hat{\mathbf{r}}}{4\pi\varepsilon_0 r^2}$$,

where ε_{0} is the vacuum electric permittivity.

Multiplying this field by a test charge $q_\textrm{test}$ gives an electric force (Coulomb's law) exerted by the field on a test charge. Note that both the force and the electric field are vector quantities, so a positive test charge will experience a force in the direction of the electric field.

== Classical gravity ==
The easiest case for the application of a test particle arises in Newton's law of universal gravitation. The general expression for the gravitational force between any two point masses $m_1$ and $m_2$ is:

$$F = -G \frac{m_1 m_2}{|\mathbf{r}_1-\mathbf{r}_2|^2}$$,

where $\mathbf{r}_1$ and $\mathbf{r}_2$ represent the position of each particle in space. In the general solution for this equation, both masses rotate around their center of mass R, in this specific case:

$$\mathbf{R} = \frac{m_1\mathbf{r}_1+m_2\mathbf{r}_2}{m_1+m_2}$$.

In the case where one of the masses is much larger than the other ($m_1\gg m_2$), one can assume that the smaller mass moves as a test particle in a gravitational field generated by the larger mass, which does not accelerate. We can define the gravitational field as

$$\mathbf{g}(r) = -\frac{Gm_1}{r^2}\hat{\mathbf{r}}$$,

with $r$ as the distance between the massive object and the test particle, and $\hat{r}$ is the unit vector in the direction going from the massive object to the test mass. Newton's second law of motion of the smaller mass reduces to

$$\mathbf{a}(r) = \frac{F}{m_2}\hat{\mathbf{r}} = \mathbf{g}(r)$$,

and thus only contains one variable, for which the solution can be calculated more easily. This approach gives very good approximations for many practical problems, e.g. the orbits of satellites, whose mass is relatively small compared to that of the Earth.

== General relativity ==
In metric theories of gravitation, particularly general relativity, a test particle is an idealized model of a small object whose mass is so small that it does not appreciably disturb the ambient gravitational field.

According to the Einstein field equations, the gravitational field is locally coupled not only to the distribution of non-gravitational mass–energy, but also to the distribution of momentum and stress (e.g. pressure, viscous stresses in a perfect fluid).

In the case of test particles in a vacuum solution or electrovacuum solution, this turns out to imply that in addition to the tidal acceleration experienced by small clouds of test particles (with spin or not), test particles with spin may experience additional accelerations due to spin–spin forces.

== See also ==
- Point particle (point mass, point charge)
