= Congruence (general relativity) =

Set of integral curves of a vector field

In general relativity, a congruence (more properly, a congruence of curves) is the set of integral curves of a (nowhere vanishing) vector field in a four-dimensional Lorentzian manifold which is interpreted physically as a model of spacetime. Often this manifold will be taken to be an exact or approximate solution to the Einstein field equation.

== Types of congruences ==
Congruences generated by nowhere vanishing timelike, null, or spacelike vector fields are called timelike, null, or spacelike respectively.

A congruence is called a geodesic congruence if it admits a tangent vector field $\vec{X}$ with vanishing covariant derivative, $\nabla_{\vec{X}} \vec{X} = 0$.

== Relation with vector fields ==
The integral curves of the vector field are a family of non-intersecting parameterized curves which fill up the spacetime. The congruence consists of the curves themselves, without reference to a particular parameterization. Many distinct vector fields can give rise to the same congruence of curves, since if $f$ is a nowhere vanishing scalar function, then $\vec{X}$ and $\vec{Y} = \, f \, \vec{X}$ give rise to the same congruence.

However, in a Lorentzian manifold, we have a metric tensor, which picks out a preferred vector field among the vector fields which are everywhere parallel to a given timelike or spacelike vector field, namely the field of tangent vectors to the curves. These are respectively timelike or spacelike unit vector fields.

== Physical interpretation ==
In general relativity, a timelike congruence in a four-dimensional Lorentzian manifold can be interpreted as a family of world lines of certain ideal observers in our spacetime. In particular, a timelike geodesic congruence can be interpreted as a family of free-falling test particles.

Null congruences are also important, particularly null geodesic congruences, which can be interpreted as a family of freely propagating light rays.

Warning: the world line of a pulse of light moving in a fiber optic cable would not in general be a null geodesic, and light in the very early universe (the radiation-dominated epoch) was not freely propagating. The world line of a radar pulse sent from Earth past the Sun to Venus would however be modeled as a null geodesic arc. In dimensions other than four, the relationship between null geodesics and "light" no longer holds: If "light" is defined as the solution to the Laplacian wave equation, then the propagator has both null and time-like components in odd space-time dimensions and is no longer a pure Dirac delta function in even space-time dimensions greater than four.

== Kinematical description ==
Describing the mutual motion of the test particles in a null geodesic congruence in a spacetime such as the Schwarzschild vacuum or FRW dust is a very important problem in general relativity. It is solved by defining certain kinematical quantities which completely describe how the integral curves in a congruence may converge (diverge) or twist about one another.

It should be stressed that the kinematical decomposition we are about to describe is pure mathematics valid for any Lorentzian manifold. However, the physical interpretation in terms of test particles and tidal accelerations (for timelike geodesic congruences) or pencils of light rays (for null geodesic congruences) is valid only for general relativity (similar interpretations may be valid in closely related theories).

=== The kinematical decomposition of a timelike congruence ===
Consider the timelike congruence generated by some timelike unit vector field X, which we should think of as a first order linear partial differential operator. Then the components of our vector field are now scalar functions given in tensor notation by writing $\vec{X} f = f_{,a} \, X^a$, where f is an arbitrary smooth function. The acceleration vector is the covariant derivative $\nabla_{\vec{X}} \vec{X}$; we can write its components in tensor notation as:

$$\dot{X}^a = {X^a}_{;b} X^b$$

Next, using ${X_b} {X^b} = -1$, observe that the equation:

$$\left( \dot{X}^a \, X_b + {X^a}_{;b} \right) \, X^b = {X^a}_{;b} \, X^b - \dot{X}^a = 0$$

means that the term in parentheses at left is the transverse part of ${X^a}_{;b}$. This orthogonality relation holds only when X is a timelike unit vector of a Lorentzian Manifold. It does not hold in more general setting. Write:

$$h_{ab} = g_{ab} + X_a \, X_b$$

for the projection tensor which projects tensors into their transverse parts; for example, the transverse part of a vector is the part orthogonal to $\vec{X}$. This tensor can be seen as the metric tensor of the hypersurface whose tangent vectors are orthogonal to X. Thus, we have shown that:

$$\dot{X}_a \, X_b + X_{a;b} = {h^m}_a \, {h^n}_b X_{m; n}$$

Next, we decompose this into its symmetric and antisymmetric parts:

$$\dot{X}_a \, X_b + X_{a;b} = \theta_{ab} + \omega_{ab}$$

Here:

$$\theta_{ab} = {h^m}_a \, {h^n}_b X_{(m;n)}$$
$$\omega_{ab} = {h^m}_a \, {h^n}_b X_{[m;n]}$$

are known as the expansion tensor and vorticity tensor respectively.

Because these tensors live in the spatial hyperplane elements orthogonal to $\vec{X}$, we may think of them as three-dimensional second rank tensors. This can be expressed more rigorously using the notion of Fermi Derivative. Therefore, we can decompose the expansion tensor into its traceless part plus a trace part. Writing the trace as $\theta$, we have:

$$\theta_{ab} = \sigma_{ab} + \frac{1}{3} \, \theta \, h_{ab}$$

Because the vorticity tensor is antisymmetric, its diagonal components vanish, so it is automatically traceless (and we can replace it with a three-dimensional vector, although we shall not do this). Therefore, we now have:

$$X_{a;b} = \sigma_{ab} + \omega_{ab} + \frac{1}{3} \, \theta \, h_{ab} - \dot{X}_a \, X_b$$

This is the desired kinematical decomposition. In the case of a timelike geodesic congruence, the last term vanishes identically.

The expansion scalar, shear tensor ($\sigma_{ab}$), and vorticity tensor of a timelike geodesic congruence have the following intuitive meaning:

1. The expansion scalar represents the fractional rate at which the volume of a small initially spherical cloud of test particles changes with respect to proper time of the particle at the center of the cloud,
2. The shear tensor represents any tendency of the initial sphere to become distorted into an ellipsoidal shape,
3. The vorticity tensor represents any tendency of the initial sphere to rotate; the vorticity vanishes if and only if the world lines in the congruence are everywhere orthogonal to the spatial hypersurfaces in some foliation of the spacetime, in which case, for a suitable coordinate chart, each hyperslice can be considered as a surface of 'constant time'.

See the citations and links below for justification of these claims.

=== Curvature and timelike congruences ===
By the Ricci identity (which is often used as the definition of the Riemann tensor), we can write:

$$X_{a;bn} - X_{a;nb} = R_{ambn} \, X^m$$

By plugging the kinematical decomposition into the left-hand side, we can establish relations between the curvature tensor and the kinematical behavior of timelike congruences (geodesic or not). These relations can be used in two ways, both very important:

1. We can (in principle) experimentally determine the curvature tensor of a spacetime from detailed observations of the kinematical behavior of any timelike congruence (geodesic or not),
2. We can obtain evolution equations for the pieces of the kinematical decomposition (expansion scalar, shear tensor, and vorticity tensor) which exhibit direct curvature coupling.

In the famous slogan of John Archibald Wheeler:

Spacetime tells matter how to move; matter tells spacetime how to curve.

We now see how to precisely quantify the first part of this assertion; the Einstein field equation quantifies the second part.

In particular, according to the Bel decomposition of the Riemann tensor, taken with respect to our timelike unit vector field, the electrogravitic tensor (or tidal tensor) is defined by:

$$E[\vec{X}]_{ab} = R_{ambn} \, X^m \, X^n$$

The Ricci identity now gives:

$$\left( X_{a:bn}-X_{a:nb} \right) \, X^n = E[\vec{X}]_{ab}$$

Plugging in the kinematical decomposition we can eventually obtain:

$$\begin{align}
E[\vec{X}]_{ab} &= \frac{2}{3} \, \theta \, \sigma_{ab} - \sigma_{am} \, {\sigma^m}_b -\omega_{am} \, {\omega^m}_b \\
& - \frac{1}{3} \left( \dot{\theta} + \frac{\theta^2}{3} \right) \, h_{ab} - {h^m}_a \, {h^n}_b \, \left( \dot{\sigma}_{mn} - \dot{X}_{(m;n)} \right) - \dot{X}_a \, \dot{X}_b \\
\end{align}$$

Here, overdots denote differentiation with respect to proper time, counted off along our timelike congruence (i.e. we take the covariant derivative with respect to the vector field X). This can be regarded as a description of how one can determine the tidal tensor from observations of a single timelike congruence.

=== Evolution equations ===
In this section, we turn to the problem of obtaining evolution equations (also called propagation equations or propagation formulae).

It will be convenient to write the acceleration vector as $\dot{X}^a = W^a$ and also to set:

$$J_{ab} = X_{a:b} = \frac{\theta}{3} \, h_{ab} + \sigma_{ab} + \omega_{ab} - \dot{X}_a \, X_b$$

Now from the Ricci identity for the tidal tensor we have:

$$\dot{J}_{ab} = J_{an;b} \, X^n - E[\vec{X}]_{ab}$$

But:

$$\left( J_{an} \, X^n \right)_{;b} = J_{an;b} \, X^n + J_{an} \, {X^n}_{;b} = J_{an;b} \, X^n + J_{am} \, {J^m}_b$$

so we have:

$$\dot{J}_{ab} = -J_{am} \, {J^m}_b - {E[\vec{X}]}_{ab} + W_{a;b}$$

By plugging in the definition of $J_{ab}$ and taking respectively the diagonal part, the traceless symmetric part, and the antisymmetric part of this equation, we obtain the desired evolution equations for the expansion scalar, the shear tensor, and the vorticity tensor.

Consider first the easier case when the acceleration vector vanishes. Then (observing that the projection tensor can be used to lower indices of purely spatial quantities), we have:

$$J_{am} \, {J^m}_b = \frac{\theta^2}{9} \, h_{ab} + \frac{2 \theta}{3} \, \left( \sigma_{ab} + \omega_{ab} \right) + \left (\sigma_{am} \, {\sigma^m}_b + \omega_{am} \, {\omega^m}_b \right) + \left (\sigma_{am} \, {\omega^m}_b + \omega_{am} \, {\sigma^m}_b \right)$$

or

$$\dot{J}_{ab} = -\frac{\theta^2}{9} \, h_{ab} - \frac{2 \theta}{3} \, \left( \sigma_{ab} + \omega_{ab} \right) -\left (\sigma_{am} \, {\sigma^m}_b + \omega_{am} \, {\omega^m}_b \right) -\left(\sigma_{am} \, {\omega^m}_b + \omega_{am} \, {\sigma^m}_b \right) - {E[\vec{X}]}_{ab}$$

By elementary linear algebra, it is easily verified that if $\Sigma, \Omega$ are respectively three dimensional symmetric and antisymmetric linear operators, then $\Sigma^2 + \Omega^2$ is symmetric while $\Sigma \, \Omega + \Omega \, \Sigma$ is antisymmetric, so by lowering an index, the corresponding combinations in parentheses above are symmetric and antisymmetric respectively. Therefore, taking the trace gives Raychaudhuri's equation (for timelike geodesics):

$$\dot{\theta} = \omega^2 - \sigma^2 - \frac{\theta^2}{3} - {E[\vec{X}]^m}_m$$

Taking the traceless symmetric part gives:

$$\dot{\sigma}_{ab} = -\frac{2\theta}{3} \, \sigma_{ab} -\left( \sigma_{am} \, {\sigma^m}_b + \omega_{am} \, {\omega^m}_b \right) - {E[\vec{X}]}_{ab} + \frac{\sigma^2 - \omega^2 + {E[\vec{X}]^m}_m}{3} \, h_{ab}$$

and taking the antisymmetric part gives:

$$\dot{\omega}_{ab} = -\frac{2\theta}{3} \, \omega_{ab} -\left (\sigma_{am} \, {\omega^m}_b + \omega_{am} \, {\sigma^m}_b \right)$$

Here:

$$\sigma^2 = \sigma_{mn} \, \sigma^{mn}, \; \omega^2 = \omega_{mn} \, \omega^{mn}$$

are quadratic invariants which are never negative, so that $\sigma, \omega$ are well-defined real invariants. The trace of the tidal tensor can also be written:

$${E[\vec{X}]^a}_a = R_{mn} \, X^m \, X^n$$

It is sometimes called the Raychaudhuri scalar; needless to say, it vanishes identically in the case of a vacuum solution.

=== See also ===
- congruence (manifolds)
- expansion scalar
- expansion tensor
- shear tensor
- vorticity tensor
- Raychaudhuri equation
