= Linearized gravity =

Linear perturbations to solutions of nonlinear Einstein field equations

In the theory of general relativity, linearized gravity is the application of perturbation theory to the metric tensor that describes the geometry of spacetime. As a consequence, linearized gravity is an effective method for modeling the effects of gravity when the gravitational field is weak. The usage of linearized gravity is integral to the study of gravitational waves and weak-field gravitational lensing.

== Weak-field approximation ==
The Einstein field equations (EFE) describing the geometry of spacetime using the MTW sign convention, including the metric signature (−+++), is

$$R_{\mu\nu} - \frac{1}{2}Rg_{\mu\nu} = \kappa T_{\mu\nu}$$

where $R_{\mu\nu}$ is the Ricci tensor, $R$ is the Ricci scalar, $T_{\mu\nu}$ is the energy–momentum tensor, $\kappa$ is the Einstein gravitational constant, and $g_{\mu\nu}$ is the spacetime metric tensor that represents the solutions of the equation.

Although succinct when written out using Einstein notation, hidden within the Ricci tensor and Ricci scalar are exceptionally nonlinear dependencies on the metric tensor that render the prospect of finding exact solutions impractical in most systems. However, when describing systems for which the curvature of spacetime is small (meaning that terms in the EFE that are quadratic in $g_{\mu\nu}$ do not significantly contribute to the equations of motion), one can model the solution of the field equations as being the Minkowski metric (Note: This assumes that the background spacetime is flat. Perturbation theory applied in a spacetime that is already curved can work just as well when this term is replaced with the metric representing the curved background.) $\eta_{\mu\nu}$ plus a small perturbation term $h_{\mu\nu}$. In other words:

$$g_{\mu\nu} = \eta_{\mu\nu} + h_{\mu\nu},\qquad |h_{\mu\nu}| \ll 1.$$

In this regime, substituting the general metric $g_{\mu\nu}$ for this perturbative approximation results in a simplified expression for the Ricci tensor:

$$R_{\mu\nu} = \frac{1}{2}(\partial_\sigma\partial_\mu h^\sigma_\nu + \partial_\sigma\partial_\nu h^\sigma_\mu - \partial_\mu\partial_\nu h - \square h_{\mu\nu}),$$

where $h = \eta^{\mu\nu}h_{\mu\nu}$ is the trace of the perturbation, $\partial_\mu$ denotes the partial derivative with respect to the $x^\mu$ coordinate of spacetime, and $\square = \eta^{\mu\nu} \partial_\mu \partial_\nu$ is the d'Alembert operator.

Together with the Ricci scalar,

$$R = \eta_{\mu\nu}R^{\mu\nu} = \partial_\mu\partial_\nu h^{\mu\nu} - \square h,$$

the left side of the field equation reduces to

$$R_{\mu\nu} - \frac{1}{2}Rg_{\mu\nu} = \frac{1}{2}(\partial_\sigma\partial_\mu h^\sigma_\nu + \partial_\sigma\partial_\nu h^\sigma_\mu - \partial_\mu\partial_\nu h - \square h_{\mu\nu} - \eta_{\mu\nu}\partial_\rho\partial_\lambda h^{\rho\lambda} + \eta_{\mu\nu}\square h).$$

and thus the EFE is reduced to a linear second order partial differential equation in terms of $h_{\mu\nu}$.

=== Gauge invariance ===
The process of decomposing the general spacetime $g_{\mu\nu}$ into the Minkowski metric plus a perturbation term is not unique. This is because different choices for coordinates may give different forms for $h_{\mu\nu}$. In order to capture this phenomenon, the concept of gauge symmetry is introduced.

Gauge symmetries are a mathematical device for describing a system that does not change when the underlying coordinate system is "shifted" by an infinitesimal amount. So although the perturbation metric $h_{\mu\nu}$ is not consistently defined between different coordinate systems, the overall system which it describes is.

To capture this formally, the non-uniqueness of the perturbation $h_{\mu\nu}$ is represented as being a consequence of the diverse collection of diffeomorphisms on spacetime that leave $h_{\mu\nu}$ sufficiently small. Therefore, it is required that $h_{\mu\nu}$ be defined in terms of a general set of diffeomorphisms, then select the subset of these that preserve the small scale that is required by the weak-field approximation. One may thus define $\phi$ to denote an arbitrary diffeomorphism that maps the flat Minkowski spacetime to the more general spacetime represented by the metric $g_{\mu\nu}$. With this, the perturbation metric may be defined as the difference between the pullback of $g_{\mu\nu}$ and the Minkowski metric:

$$h_{\mu\nu} = (\phi^*g)_{\mu\nu} - \eta_{\mu\nu}.$$

The diffeomorphisms $\phi$ may thus be chosen such that $\vert h_{\mu\nu} \vert \ll 1$.

Given then a vector field $\xi^\mu$ defined on the flat background spacetime, an additional family of diffeomorphisms $\psi_\epsilon$ may be defined as those generated by $\xi^\mu$ and parameterized by $\epsilon > 0$. These new diffeomorphisms will be used to represent the coordinate transformations for "infinitesimal shifts" as discussed above. Together with $\phi$, a family of perturbations is given by

$$\begin{align}
h^{(\epsilon)}_{\mu\nu} &= [(\phi\circ\psi_\epsilon)^*g]_{\mu\nu} - \eta_{\mu\nu} \\
&= [\psi^*_\epsilon(\phi^*g)]_{\mu\nu} - \eta_{\mu\nu} \\
&= \psi^*_\epsilon(h + \eta)_{\mu\nu} - \eta_{\mu\nu} \\
&= (\psi^*_\epsilon h)_{\mu\nu} + \epsilon\left[\frac{(\psi^*_\epsilon\eta)_{\mu\nu} - \eta_{\mu\nu}}{\epsilon}\right].
\end{align}$$

Therefore, in the limit $\epsilon\rightarrow 0$,

$$h^{(\epsilon)}_{\mu\nu} = h_{\mu\nu} + \epsilon\mathcal{L}_\xi\eta_{\mu\nu}$$

where $\mathcal{L}_\xi$ is the Lie derivative along the vector field $\xi_\mu$.

The Lie derivative works out to yield the final gauge transformation of the perturbation metric $h_{\mu\nu}$:

$$h^{(\epsilon)}_{\mu\nu} = h_{\mu\nu} + \epsilon(\partial_\mu\xi_\nu + \partial_\nu\xi_\mu),$$

which precisely define the set of perturbation metrics that describe the same physical system. In other words, it characterizes the gauge symmetry of the linearized field equations.

=== Choice of gauge ===
By exploiting gauge invariance, certain properties of the perturbation metric can be guaranteed by choosing a suitable vector field $\xi^\mu$.

==== Transverse gauge ====
To study how the perturbation $h_{\mu\nu}$ distorts measurements of length, it is useful to define the following spatial tensor:

$$s_{ij} = h_{ij} - \frac{1}{3}\delta^{kl}h_{kl}\delta_{ij}$$

(Note that the indices span only spatial components: $i,j\in\{1,2,3\}$). Thus, by using $s_{ij}$, the spatial components of the perturbation can be decomposed as

$$h_{ij} = s_{ij} - \Psi\delta_{ij}$$

where $\Psi = \frac{1}{3}\delta^{kl}h_{kl}$.

The tensor $s_{ij}$ is, by construction, traceless and is referred to as the strain since it represents the amount by which the perturbation stretches and contracts measurements of space. In the context of studying gravitational radiation, the strain is particularly useful when utilized with the transverse gauge. This gauge is defined by choosing the spatial components of $\xi^\mu$ to satisfy the relation

$$\nabla^2\xi^j + \frac{1}{3}\partial_j\partial_i\xi^i = -\partial_i s^{ij},$$

then choosing the time component $\xi^0$ to satisfy

$$\nabla^2\xi^0 = \partial_i h_{0i} + \partial_0\partial_i\xi^i.$$

After performing the gauge transformation using the formula in the previous section, the strain becomes spatially transverse:

$$\partial_i s^{ij}_{(\epsilon)} = 0,$$

with the additional property:

$$\partial_i h^{0i}_{(\epsilon)} = 0.$$

==== Synchronous gauge ====
The synchronous gauge simplifies the perturbation metric by requiring that the metric not distort measurements of time. More precisely, the synchronous gauge is chosen such that the non-spatial components of $h^{(\epsilon)}_{\mu\nu}$ are zero, namely

$$h^{(\epsilon)}_{0\nu} = 0.$$

This can be achieved by requiring the time component of $\xi^\mu$ to satisfy

$$\partial_0\xi^0 = -h_{00}$$

and requiring the spatial components to satisfy

$$\partial_0\xi^i = \partial_i\xi^0 - h_{0i}.$$

==== Harmonic gauge ====
The harmonic gauge (also referred to as the Lorenz gauge (Note: Not to be confused with Lorentz.)) is selected whenever it is necessary to reduce the linearized field equations as much as possible. This can be done if the condition

$$\partial_\mu h^\mu_\nu = \frac{1}{2}\partial_\nu h$$

is true. To achieve this, $\xi_\mu$ is required to satisfy the relation

$$\square\xi_\mu = -\partial_\nu h^\nu_\mu + \frac{1}{2}\partial_\mu h.$$

Consequently, by using the harmonic gauge, the Einstein tensor $G_{\mu\nu} = R_{\mu\nu} - \frac{1}{2}Rg_{\mu\nu}$ reduces to

$$G_{\mu\nu} = -\frac{1}{2}\square\left(h^{(\epsilon)}_{\mu\nu} - \frac{1}{2}h^{(\epsilon)}\eta_{\mu\nu}\right).$$

Therefore, by writing it in terms of a "trace-reversed" metric, $\bar{h}^{(\epsilon)}_{\mu\nu} = h^{(\epsilon)}_{\mu\nu} - \frac{1}{2}h^{(\epsilon)}\eta_{\mu\nu}$, the linearized field equations reduce to

$$\square \bar{h}^{(\epsilon)}_{\mu\nu} = -2\kappa T_{\mu\nu}.$$

This can be solved exactly, to produce the wave solutions that define gravitational radiation.

== See also ==
- Correspondence principle
- Gravitoelectromagnetism
- Lanczos tensor
- Parameterized post-Newtonian formalism
- Post-Newtonian expansion
- Quasinormal mode
