= Vacuum solution =

Lorentzian manifold with vanishing Einstein tensor

In general relativity, a vacuum solution is a Lorentzian manifold whose Einstein tensor vanishes identically. According to the Einstein field equation, this means that the stress–energy tensor also vanishes identically, so that no matter or non-gravitational fields are present. These are distinct from the electrovacuum solutions, which take into account the electromagnetic field in addition to the gravitational field. Vacuum solutions are also distinct from the lambdavacuum solutions, where the only term in the stress–energy tensor is the cosmological constant term (and thus, the lambdavacuums can be taken as cosmological models).

More generally, a vacuum region in a Lorentzian manifold is a region in which the Einstein tensor vanishes.

Vacuum solutions are a special case of the more general exact solutions in general relativity.

== Equivalent conditions ==
It is a mathematical fact that the Einstein tensor vanishes if and only if the Ricci tensor vanishes. This follows from the fact that these two second rank tensors stand in a kind of dual relationship; they are the trace reverse of each other:

$$G_{ab} = R_{ab} - \frac{R}{2} \, g_{ab}, \; \; R_{ab} = G_{ab} - \frac{G}{2} \, g_{ab}$$

where the traces are $R = {R^a}_a, \; \; G = {G^a}_a = -R$.

A third equivalent condition follows from the Ricci decomposition of the Riemann curvature tensor as a sum of the Weyl curvature tensor plus terms built out of the Ricci tensor: the Weyl and Riemann tensors agree, $R_{abcd}=C_{abcd}$, in some region if and only if it is a vacuum region.

== Gravitational energy ==
Since $T^{ab} = 0$ in a vacuum region, it might seem that according to general relativity, vacuum regions must contain no energy. But the gravitational field can do work, so we must expect the gravitational field itself to possess energy, and it does. However, determining the precise location of this gravitational field energy is technically problematical in general relativity, by its very nature of the clean separation into a universal gravitational interaction and "all the rest".

The fact that the gravitational field itself possesses energy yields a way to understand the nonlinearity of the Einstein field equation: this gravitational field energy itself produces more gravity. (This is described as "the gravity of gravity", or by saying that "gravity gravitates".) This means that the gravitational field outside the Sun is a bit stronger according to general relativity than it is according to Newton's theory.

== Examples ==
Well-known examples of explicit vacuum solutions include:

- Minkowski spacetime (which describes empty space with no cosmological constant)
- Milne model (which is a model developed by E. A. Milne describing an empty universe which has no curvature)
- Schwarzschild vacuum (which describes the spacetime geometry around a spherical mass),
- Kerr vacuum (which describes the geometry around a rotating object),
- Taub–NUT vacuum (a famous counterexample describing the exterior gravitational field of an isolated object with strange properties),
- Kerns–Wild vacuum (Robert M. Kerns and Walter J. Wild 1982) (a Schwarzschild object immersed in an ambient "almost uniform" gravitational field),
- double Kerr vacuum (two Kerr objects sharing the same axis of rotation, but held apart by unphysical zero active gravitational mass "cables" going out to suspension points infinitely removed),
- Khan–Penrose vacuum (K. A. Khan and Roger Penrose 1971) (a simple colliding plane wave model),
- Oszváth–Schücking vacuum (the circularly polarized sinusoidal gravitational wave, another famous counterexample).
- Kasner metric (An anisotropic solution, used to study gravitational chaos in three or more dimensions).

These all belong to one or more general families of solutions:

- the Weyl vacua (Hermann Weyl) (the family of all static vacuum solutions),
- the Beck vacua (Guido Beck 1925) (the family of all cylindrically symmetric nonrotating vacuum solutions),
- the Ernst vacua (Frederick J. Ernst 1968) (the family of all stationary axisymmetric vacuum solutions),
- the Ehlers vacua (Jürgen Ehlers) (the family of all cylindrically symmetric vacuum solutions),
- the Szekeres vacua (George Szekeres) (the family of all colliding gravitational plane wave models),
- the Gowdy vacua (Robert H. Gowdy) (cosmological models constructed using gravitational waves),

Several of the families mentioned here, members of which are obtained by solving an appropriate linear or nonlinear, real or complex partial differential equation, turn out to be very closely related, in perhaps surprising ways.

In addition to these, we also have the vacuum pp-wave spacetimes, which include the gravitational plane waves.

== See also ==
- Introduction to the mathematics of general relativity
- Topological defect
