= Vaidya metric =

Exact spherically symmetric solution in GR

In general relativity, the Vaidya metric describes the non-empty external spacetime of a spherically symmetric and nonrotating star which is either emitting or absorbing null dusts. It is named after the Indian physicist Prahalad Chunnilal Vaidya and constitutes the simplest non-static generalization of the non-radiative Schwarzschild solution to Einstein's field equation, and therefore is also called the "radiating(shining) Schwarzschild metric".

== From Schwarzschild to Vaidya metrics ==
The Schwarzschild metric as the static and spherically symmetric solution to Einstein's equation reads

$$ds^2=-\left( 1-\frac{2M}{r} \right) dt^2 + \left( 1-\frac{2M}{r} \right)^{-1}dr^2+r^2 \left(d\theta^2+\sin^2\theta\,d\phi^2\right).$$	1

To remove the coordinate singularity of this metric at $r=2M$, one could switch to the Eddington–Finkelstein coordinates. Thus, introduce the "retarded(/outgoing)" null coordinate $u$ by

$$t=u+r+2M\ln\left(\frac{r}{2M}-1\right)\qquad\Rightarrow\quad dt=du+\left( 1-\frac{2M}{r} \right)^{-1} dr\;,$$	2

and Eq(1) could be transformed into the "retarded(/outgoing) Schwarzschild metric"

$$ds^2=-\left( 1-\frac{2M}{r} \right) du^2- 2du dr + r^2\left(d\theta^2 + \sin^2\theta\,d\phi^2\right);$$	3

or, we could instead employ the "advanced(/ingoing)" null coordinate $v$ by

$$t=v-r-2M\ln\left(\frac{r}{2M}-1\right)\qquad\Rightarrow\quad dt=dv-\left( 1-\frac{2M}{r} \right)^{-1}dr\;,$$	4

so Eq(1) becomes the "advanced(/ingoing) Schwarzschild metric"

$$ds^2=-\left( 1-\frac{2M}{r} \right) dv^2+2dvdr+r^2 \left(d\theta^2 + \sin^2\theta\,d\phi^2\right).$$	5

Eq(3) and Eq(5), as static and spherically symmetric solutions, are valid for both ordinary celestial objects with finite radii and singular objects such as black holes. It turns out that, it is still physically reasonable if one extends the mass parameter $M$ in Eqs(3) and Eq(5) from a constant to functions of the corresponding null coordinate, $M(u)$ and $M(v)$ respectively, thus

$$ds^2 = -\left( 1-\frac{2M(u)}{r} \right) du^2 - 2 du dr + r^2\left(d\theta^2 +\ sin^2\theta\,d\phi^2\right),$$	6

$$ds^2=-\left( 1-\frac{2M(v)}{r} \right) dv^2 + 2 dv dr+r^2 \left(d\theta^2 + \sin^2\theta\,d\phi^2\right).$$	7

The extended metrics Eq(6) and Eq(7) are respectively the "retarded(/outgoing)" and "advanced(/ingoing)" Vaidya metrics. It is also sometimes useful to recast the Vaidya metrics Eqs(6)(7) into the form

$$ds^2 =\frac{2M(u)}{r}du^2 +ds^2(\text{flat})=\frac{2M(v)}{r}dv^2 +ds^2(\text{flat})\,,$$	8

where $ds^2(\text{flat})$ represents the metric of flat spacetime:
$$\begin{align}
ds^2(\text{flat}) &= - du^2 - 2 du dr+r^2 \left(d\theta^2+\sin^2\theta\, d\phi^2 \right) \\
&= - dv^2 +2 dv dr+r^2 \left(d\theta^2+\sin^2\theta\, d\phi^2 \right) \\
&= -dT^2+dr^2+r^2 \left(d\theta^2+\sin^2\theta\, d\phi^2 \right)
\end{align}$$
using $T = t - 2M\ln(r/2M-1)$.

== Outgoing Vaidya with pure Emitting field ==
As for the "retarded(/outgoing)" Vaidya metric Eq(6), the Ricci tensor has only one nonzero component

$$R_{uu}=-2\frac{M(u)_{,\,u}}{r^2}\,,$$	9

while the Ricci curvature scalar vanishes, $R=g^{ab} R_{ab}=0$ because $g^{uu}=0$. Thus, according to the trace-free Einstein equation $G_{ab}=R_{ab}=8\pi T_{ab}$, the stress–energy tensor $T_{ab}$ satisfies

$$T_{ab}=-\frac{M(u)_{,\,u}}{4\pi r^2} l_a l_b\;,\qquad l_a dx^a=-du\;,$$	10

where $l_a=-\partial_au$ and $l^a=g^{ab}l_b$ are null (co)vectors (c.f. Box A below). Thus, $T_{ab}$ is a "pure radiation field", which has an energy density of $-\frac{M(u)_{,\,u}}{4\pi r^2}$. According to the null energy conditions

$$T_{ab}k^ak^b\geq 0\;,$$	11

we have $M(u)_{,\,u}<0$ and thus the central body is emitting radiation.

Following the calculations using Newman–Penrose (NP) formalism in Box A, the outgoing Vaidya spacetime Eq(6) is of Petrov-type D, and the nonzero components of the Weyl-NP and Ricci-NP scalars are

$$\Psi_2=-\frac{M(u)}{r^3}\qquad \Phi_{22}=-\frac{M(u)_{\,,\,u}}{r^2}\;.$$	12

It is notable that, the Vaidya field is a pure radiation field rather than electromagnetic fields. The emitted particles or energy-matter flows have zero rest mass and thus are generally called "null dusts", typically such as photons and neutrinos, but cannot be electromagnetic waves because the Maxwell-NP equations are not satisfied. The outgoing and ingoing null expansion rates for the line element Eq(6) are respectively

$$\theta_{(\ell)} = -(\rho+\bar\rho) = \frac{2}{r}\,,\quad \theta_{(n)}=\mu+\bar\mu=\frac{-r+2M(u)}{r^2}\;.$$	13

Suppose $F:=1-\frac{2M(u)}{r}$, then the Lagrangian for null radial geodesics $(L=0, \dot\theta=0, \dot\phi=0)$ of the "retarded(/outgoing)" Vaidya spacetime Eq(6) is
$$L=0=-F\dot{u}^2+2\dot{u}\dot{r}\,,$$
where dot means derivative with respect to some parameter $\lambda$. This Lagrangian has two solutions,
$$\dot{u}=0\quad\text{and}\quad \dot{r} = \frac{F}{2} \dot{u}\;.$$

According to the definition of $u$ in Eq(2), one could find that when $t$ increases, the areal radius $r$ would increase as well for the solution $\dot{u} = 0$, while $r$ would decrease for the solution $\dot{r}=\frac{F}{2} \dot{u}$. Thus, $\dot{u}=0$ should be recognized as an outgoing solution while $\dot{r} = \frac{F}{2} \dot{u}$ serves as an ingoing solution. Now, we can construct a complex null tetrad which is adapted to the outgoing null radial geodesics and employ the Newman–Penrose formalism for perform a full analysis of the outgoing Vaidya spacetime. Such an outgoing adapted tetrad can be set up as
$$l^a=(0,1,0,0)\,,\quad n^a=\left(1,-\frac{F}{2},0,0\right)\,,\quad m^a=\frac{1}{\sqrt{2}\,r}(0,0,1,i\,\csc\theta)\,,$$
and the dual basis covectors are therefore
$$l_a=(-1,0,0,0)\, ,\quad n_a=\left(-\frac{F}{2}, -1,0,0 \right)\,,\quad m_a=\frac{r}{\sqrt{2}}(0,0,1,\sin\theta)\,.$$

In this null tetrad, the spin coefficients are
$$\kappa=\sigma=\tau=0\,,\quad \nu=\lambda=\pi=0\,,\quad \varepsilon=0$$
$$\rho=-\frac{1}{r}\,,\quad \mu=\frac{-r+2M(u)}{2r^2}\,,\quad \alpha=-\beta=\frac{-\sqrt{2}\cot\theta}{4r} \,,\quad \gamma=\frac{M(u)}{2r^2}\,.$$

The Weyl-NP and Ricci-NP scalars are given by
$$\Psi_0=\Psi_1=\Psi_3=\Psi_4=0\,,\quad \Psi_2=-\frac{M(u)}{r^3}\,,$$
$$\Phi_{00} = \Phi_{10} = \Phi_{20} = \Phi_{11} = \Phi_{12} = \Lambda = 0\,,\quad \Phi_{22}=-\frac{M(u)_{\,,\,u}}{r^2}\,,$$

Since the only nonvanishing Weyl-NP scalar is $\Psi_2$, the "retarded(/outgoing)" Vaidya spacetime is of Petrov-type D. Also, there exists a radiation field as $\Phi_{22}\neq 0$.

For the "retarded(/outgoing)" Schwarzschild metric Eq(3), let $G:=1-\frac{2M}{r}$, and then the Lagrangian for null radial geodesics will have an outgoing solution $\dot{u}=0$ and an ingoing solution $\dot{r}=-\frac{G}{2}\dot{u}$. Similar to Box A, now set up the adapted outgoing tetrad by
$$l^a=(0,1,0,0)\,,\quad n^a=\left(1,-\frac{G}{2},0,0\right)\,,\quad m^a=\frac{1}{\sqrt{2}\,r}(0,0,1,i\,\csc\theta)\,,$$
$$l_a=(-1,0,0,0)\, ,\quad n_a=\left(-\frac{G}{2},-1,0,0\right)\,,\quad m_a=\frac{r}{\sqrt{2}}(0,0,1,\sin\theta)\,.$$
so the spin coefficients are
$$\kappa=\sigma=\tau=0\,,\quad \nu=\lambda=\pi=0\,,\quad \varepsilon=0$$
$$\rho=-\frac{1}{r}\,,\quad \mu=\frac{-r+2M}{2r^2}\,,\quad \alpha=-\beta=\frac{-\sqrt{2}\cot\theta}{4r}\,,\quad \gamma=\frac{M}{2r^2}\,,$$
and the Weyl-NP and Ricci-NP scalars are given by
$$\Psi_0 = \Psi_1 = \Psi_3 = \Psi_4 = 0\,,\quad \Psi_2=-\frac{M}{r^3}\,,$$
$$\Phi_{00}=\Phi_{10}=\Phi_{20}=\Phi_{11}=\Phi_{12}=\Phi_{22}=\Lambda=0 \,.$$

The "retarded(/outgoing)" Schwarzschild spacetime is of Petrov-type D with $\Psi_2$ being the only nonvanishing Weyl-NP scalar.

== Ingoing Vaidya with pure absorbing field ==
As for the "advanced/ingoing" Vaidya metric Eq(7), the Ricci tensors again have one nonzero component

$$R_{vv}=2\frac{M(v)_{,\,v}}{r^2}\,,$$	14

and therefore $R=0$ and the stress–energy tensor is

$$T_{ab} =\frac{M(v)_{,\,v}}{4\pi r^2}\,n_a n_b \;,\qquad n_a dx^a=-dv\;.$$	15

This is a pure radiation field with energy density $\frac{M(v)_{,\,v}}{4\pi r^2}$, and once again it follows from the null energy condition Eq(11) that $M(v)_{,\,v}>0$, so the central object is absorbing null dusts. As calculated in Box C, the nonzero Weyl-NP and Ricci-NP components of the "advanced/ingoing" Vaidya metric Eq(7) are

$$\Psi_2=-\frac{M(v)}{r^3}\qquad \Phi_{00}=\frac{M(v)_{\,,\,v}}{r^2}\;.$$	16

Also, the outgoing and ingoing null expansion rates for the line element Eq(7) are respectively

$$\theta_{(\ell)} = -(\rho+\bar\rho) = \frac{r-2M(v)}{r^2}\,,\quad \theta_{(n)}=\mu+\bar\mu=-\frac{2}{r}\;.$$	17

The advanced/ingoing Vaidya solution Eq(7) is especially useful in black-hole physics as it is one of the few existing exact dynamical solutions. For example, it is often employed to investigate the differences between different definitions of the dynamical black-hole boundaries, such as the classical event horizon and the quasilocal trapping horizon; and as shown by Eq(17), the evolutionary hypersurface $r=2M(v)$ is always a marginally outer trapped horizon ($\theta_{(\ell)}=0\;, \theta_{(n)}<0$).

Suppose $\tilde{F}:=1-\frac{2M(v)}{r}$, then the Lagrangian for null radial geodesics of the "advanced(/ingoing)" Vaidya spacetime Eq(7) is
$$L=-\tilde{F}\dot{v}^2+2\dot{v}\dot{r}\,,$$
which has an ingoing solution $\dot{v}=0$ and an outgoing solution $\dot{r} = \frac{\tilde{F}}{2} \dot{v}$ in accordance with the definition of $v$ in Eq(4). Now, we can construct a complex null tetrad which is adapted to the ingoing null radial geodesics and employ the Newman–Penrose formalism for perform a full analysis of the Vaidya spacetime. Such an ingoing adapted tetrad can be set up as
$$l^a=\left(1,\frac{\tilde{F}}{2},0,0\right)\,,\quad n^a=(0,-1,0,0)\,,\quad m^a=\frac{1}{\sqrt{2}\,r}(0,0,1,i\,\csc\theta)\,,$$
and the dual basis covectors are therefore
$$l_a=\left(-\frac{\tilde{F}}{2},1,0,0\right)\,,\quad n_a=(-1,0,0,0)\,,\quad m_a=\frac{r}{\sqrt{2}}(0,0,1,\sin\theta)\,.$$

In this null tetrad, the spin coefficients are
$$\kappa=\sigma=\tau=0\,,\quad \nu=\lambda=\pi=0\,,\quad \gamma=0$$
$$\rho=\frac{-r+2M(v)}{2r^2}\,,\quad \mu=-\frac{1}{r}\,,\quad \alpha=-\beta=\frac{-\sqrt{2}\cot\theta}{4r} \,,\quad \varepsilon=\frac{M(v)}{2r^2}\,.$$

The Weyl-NP and Ricci-NP scalars are given by
$$\Psi_0=\Psi_1=\Psi_3=\Psi_4=0\,,\quad \Psi_2=-\frac{M(v)}{r^3}\,,$$
$$\Phi_{10}=\Phi_{20}=\Phi_{11}=\Phi_{12}=\Phi_{22}=\Lambda=0\,,\quad \Phi_{00}=\frac{M(v)_{\,,\,v}}{r^2}\;.$$

Since the only nonvanishing Weyl-NP scalar is $\Psi_2$, the "advanced(/ingoing)" Vaidya spacetime is of Petrov-type D, and there exists a radiation field encoded into $\Phi_{00}$.

For the "advanced(/ingoing)" Schwarzschild metric Eq(5), still let $G:=1-\frac{2M}{r}$, and then the Lagrangian for the null radial geodesics will have an ingoing solution $\dot{v}=0$ and an outgoing solution $\dot{r} = \frac{G}{2} \dot{v}$. Similar to Box C, now set up the adapted ingoing tetrad by
$$l^a=\left(1,\frac{G}{2},0,0\right)\,,\quad n^a=(0,-1,0,0)\,,\quad m^a=\frac{1}{\sqrt{2}\,r}(0,0,1,i\,\csc\theta)\,,$$
$$l_a=\left(-\frac{G}{2},1,0,0\right)\,,\quad n_a=(-1,0,0,0)\,,\quad m_a=\frac{r}{\sqrt{2}}(0,0,1,\sin\theta)\,.$$
so the spin coefficients are
$$\kappa=\sigma=\tau=0\,,\quad \nu=\lambda=\pi=0\,,\quad \gamma=0$$
$$\rho=\frac{-r+2M}{2r^2}\,,\quad \mu=-\frac{1}{r}\,,\quad \alpha=-\beta=\frac{-\sqrt{2}\cot\theta}{4r} \,,\quad \varepsilon=\frac{M}{2r^2}\,,$$
and the Weyl-NP and Ricci-NP scalars are given by
$$\Psi_0=\Psi_1=\Psi_3=\Psi_4=0\,,\quad \Psi_2=-\frac{M}{r^3}\,,$$
$$\Phi_{00}=\Phi_{10}=\Phi_{20}=\Phi_{11}=\Phi_{12}=\Phi_{22}=\Lambda=0 \,.$$

The "advanced(/ingoing)" Schwarzschild spacetime is of Petrov-type D with $\Psi_2$ being the only nonvanishing Weyl-NP scalar.

== Comparison with the Schwarzschild metric ==
As a natural and simplest extension of the Schwarzschild metric, the Vaidya metric still has a lot in common with it:

- Both metrics are of Petrov-type D with $\Psi_2$ being the only nonvanishing Weyl-NP scalar (as calculated in Boxes A and B).

However, there are three clear differences between the Schwarzschild and Vaidya metric:

- First of all, the mass parameter $M$ for Schwarzschild is a constant, while for Vaidya $M(u)$ is a u-dependent function.
- Schwarzschild is a solution to the vacuum Einstein equation $R_{ab}=0$, while Vaidya is a solution to the trace-free Einstein equation $R_{ab}=8\pi T_{ab}$ with a nontrivial pure radiation energy field. As a result, all Ricci-NP scalars for Schwarzschild are vanishing, while we have $\Phi_{00}=\frac{M(u)_{\,,\,u}}{r^2}$ for Vaidya.
- Schwarzschild has 4 independent Killing vector fields, including a timelike one, and thus is a static metric, while Vaidya has only 3 independent Killing vector fields regarding the spherical symmetry, and consequently is nonstatic. Consequently, the Schwarzschild metric belongs to Weyl's class of solutions while the Vaidya metric does not.

== Extension of the Vaidya metric ==
=== Kinnersley metric ===
While the Vaidya metric is an extension of the Schwarzschild metric to include a pure radiation field, the Kinnersley metric constitutes a further extension of the Vaidya metric; it describes a massive object that accelerates in recoil as it emits massless radiation anisotropically. The Kinnersley metric is a special case of the Kerr-Schild metric, and in cartesian spacetime coordinates $x^{\mu}$ it takes the following form:

$$g_{\mu \nu} = \eta_{\mu \nu} - \frac{2m\bigl(u(x)\bigr)}{r(x)^{3}} \sigma_{\mu}(x) \sigma_{\nu}(x)$$	18

$$r(x) = \sigma_{\mu}(x) \,\, \lambda^{\mu}(u(x))$$	19

$$\sigma^{\mu}(x) = X^{\mu}(u(x)) - x^{\mu}, \quad \eta_{\mu \nu} \sigma^{\mu}(x) \sigma^{\nu}(x) = 0$$	20

where for the duration of this section all indices shall be raised and lowered using the "flat space" metric $\eta_{\mu \nu}$, the "mass" $m(u)$ is an arbitrary function of the proper-time $u$ along the mass's world line as measured using the "flat" metric, $du^2 = \eta_{\mu \nu} \, dX^{\mu} dX^{\nu},$ and $X^{\mu}(u)$ describes the arbitrary world line of the mass, $\lambda^{\mu}(u) = dX^{\mu}(u) / du$ is then the four-velocity of the mass, $\sigma_{\mu}(x)$ is a "flat metric" null-vector field implicitly defined by Eqn. (20), and $u(x)$ implicitly extends the proper-time parameter to a scalar field throughout spacetime by viewing it as constant on the outgoing light cone of the "flat" metric that emerges from the event $X^{\mu}(u),$ and satisfies the identity $\lambda^{\mu}(u(x)) \, \partial_{\mu} u(x) = 1.$ Grinding out the Einstein tensor for the metric $g_{\mu \nu}$ and integrating the outgoing energy–momentum flux "at infinity," one finds that the metric $g_{\mu \nu}$ describes a mass with proper-time dependent four-momentum $P^{\mu} = m(u) \, \lambda^{\mu}(u)$ that emits a net <<link:0>> at a proper rate of $-dP^{\mu}/du;$ as viewed from the mass's instantaneous rest-frame, the radiation flux has an angular distribution $A(u) + B(u) \, \cos(\theta(u)),$ where $A(u)$ and $B(u)$ are complicated scalar functions of $m(u), \lambda^{\mu}(u), \sigma_{\mu}(u),$ and their derivatives, and $\theta(u)$ is the instantaneous rest-frame angle between the 3-acceleration and the outgoing null-vector. The Kinnersley metric may therefore be viewed as describing the gravitational field of an accelerating photon rocket with a very badly collimated exhaust.

In the special case where $\lambda^{\mu}$ is independent of proper-time, the Kinnersley metric reduces to the Vaidya metric.

=== Vaidya–Bonner metric ===
Since the radiated or absorbed matter might be electrically non-neutral, the outgoing and ingoing Vaidya metrics Eqs(6)(7) can be naturally extended to include varying electric charges,

$$ds^2 = - \left( 1-\frac{2M(u)}{r} + \frac{Q(u)}{r^2} \right) du^2-2dudr+r^2(d\theta^2+\sin^2\theta\,d\phi^2)\;,$$	18

$$ds^2 = -\left( 1-\frac{2M(v)}{r}+\frac{Q(v)}{r^2} \right) dv^2+2dvdr+r^2(d\theta^2+\sin^2\theta\,d\phi^2)\;.$$	19

Eqs(18)(19) are called the Vaidya-Bonner metrics, and apparently, they can also be regarded as extensions of the Reissner–Nordström metric, analogously to the correspondence between Vaidya and Schwarzschild metrics.

== See also ==
- Schwarzschild metric
- Null dust solution
