= Charles Hellaby =

South African mathematician

Charles William Hellaby
- Education: University of St Andrews
- Alma mater: Queen's University
- Known for: Studies in inhomogeneous cosmology and general relativity
- Spouse: Shirifat (Sharifa) Adonis
- Children: Blake Zayn Hellaby; Zoe Munirih Hellaby
- Scientific career
- Fields: Applied mathematics Cosmology
- Institutions: University of Cape Town
- Academic advisors: Kayll Lake
- Website: Prof Hellaby at UCT

Charles William Hellaby is a South African mathematician who is an associate professor of applied mathematics at the University of Cape Town, South Africa, working in the field of cosmology. He is a member of the International Astronomical Union and a member of the Baháʼí Faith.

== Life ==
Hellaby was born to Rev. William Allen Meldrum Hellaby and Emily Madeline Hellaby. His twin brother, Mark Edwin Hellaby, pursued a career in literature while his younger brother, Julian Meldrum Hellaby, took to music as a career. He obtained a BSc (Physics & Astronomy) at the University of St Andrews, Scotland in 1977. He completed his MSc (Relativity) at Queen's University, Kingston, Ontario in 1981 and his PhD (Relativity) at Queen's University in 1985.

From 1985 to 1988 he was a Post Doctoral Researcher at the University of Cape Town under George Ellis. In 1989 he was appointed a lecturer at the University of Cape Town.

Hellaby is a member of the International Astronomical Union (Division J Galaxies and Cosmology), having previously been a member of Division VIII Galaxies & the Universe and subsequently Commission 47 Cosmology.

== Research ==
His research interests include:

- Inhomogeneous cosmology. Standard cosmology assumes a smooth homogeneous universe, but the real universe is very lumpy
- Inhomogeneous cosmological models - their evolution, geometry and singularities
- Non-linear structure formation in the universe
- Extracting the geometry of the cosmos from observations
- The Lemaitre–Tolman cosmological model
- The Szekeres cosmological model
- Junction conditions in GR
- Dense black holes
- Local inhomogeneities and the Swiss cheese model

He has also worked on

- The models of Vaidya, Schwarzschild–Kruskal–Szekeres & Kinnersley
- Classical signature change
- Cosmic strings
- Gravitational collapse

Hellaby co-authored Structures in the Universe by Exact Methods: Formation, Evolution, Interactions in which applications of inhomogenous solutions to Albert Einstein's field equations of cosmology are reviewed. The structure of galaxy clusters, galaxies with central black holes and supernovae dimming can be studied with the aid of inhomogenous models.
