= Construction of a complex null tetrad =

Formulation in general relativity

Calculations in the Newman–Penrose (NP) formalism of general relativity normally begin with the construction of a complex null tetrad $\{l^a,n^a,m^a,\bar{m}^a\}$, where $\{l^a,n^a\}$ is a pair of real null vectors and $\{m^a,\bar{m}^a\}$ is a pair of complex null vectors. These tetrad vectors respect the following normalization and metric conditions assuming the spacetime signature $(-,+,+,+):$

- $l_a l^a=n_a n^a=m_a m^a=\bar{m}_a \bar{m}^a=0\,;$
- $l_a m^a=l_a \bar{m}^a=n_a m^a=n_a \bar{m}^a=0\,;$
- $l_a n^a=l^a n_a=-1\,,\;\; m_a \bar{m}^a=m^a \bar{m}_a=1\,;$
- $g_{ab}=-l_a n_b - n_a l_b +m_a \bar{m}_b +\bar{m}_a m_b\,, \;\; g^{ab}=-l^a n^b - n^a l^b +m^a \bar{m}^b +\bar{m}^a m^b\,.$

Only after the tetrad $\{l^a,n^a,m^a,\bar{m}^a\}$ gets constructed can one move forward to compute the directional derivatives, spin coefficients, commutators, Weyl-NP scalars $\Psi_i$, Ricci-NP scalars $\Phi_{ij}$ and Maxwell-NP scalars $\phi_i$ and other quantities in NP formalism. There are three most commonly used methods to construct a complex null tetrad:

1. All four tetrad vectors are nonholonomic combinations of orthonormal tetrads;
2. $l^a$ (or $n^a$) are aligned with the outgoing (or ingoing) tangent vector field of null radial geodesics, while $m^a$ and $\bar{m}^a$ are constructed via the nonholonomic method;
3. A tetrad which is adapted to the spacetime structure from a 3+1 perspective, with its general form being assumed and tetrad functions therein to be solved.

In the context below, it will be shown how these three methods work.

Note: In addition to the convention $\{(-,+,+,+); l^a n_a=-1\,,m^a \bar{m}_a=1\}$ employed in this article, the other one in use is $\{(+,-,-,-); l^a n_a=1\,,m^a \bar{m}_a=-1\}$.

== Nonholonomic tetrad ==
The primary method to construct a complex null tetrad is via combinations of orthonormal bases. For a spacetime $g_{ab}$ with an orthonormal tetrad $\{\omega_0\,,\omega_1\,,\omega_2\,,\omega_3 \}$,

$g_{ab}=-\omega_0\omega_0+\omega_1\omega_1+\omega_2\omega_2+\omega_3\omega_3\,,$

the covectors $\{l_a\,,n_a\,,m_a\,,\bar{m}_a\}$ of the nonholonomic complex null tetrad can be constructed by

$l_adx^a=\frac{\omega_0+\omega_1}{\sqrt{2}}\,,\quad n_adx^a=\frac{\omega_0-\omega_1}{\sqrt{2}}\,,$
$m_adx^a=\frac{\omega_2+i\omega_3}{\sqrt{2}}\,,\quad \bar{m}_adx^a=\frac{\omega_2-i\omega_3}{\sqrt{2}}\,,$

and the tetrad vectors $\{l^a\,,n^a\,,m^a\,,\bar{m}^a\}$ can be obtained by raising the indices of $\{l_a\,,n_a\,,m_a\,,\bar{m}_a\}$ via the inverse metric $g^{ab}$.

Remark: The nonholonomic construction is actually in accordance with the local light cone structure.

Example: A nonholonomic tetrad

Given a spacetime metric of the form (in signature(-,+,+,+))

$$g_{ab}=-g_{tt}dt^2+g_{rr}dr^2+g_{\theta\theta}d\theta^2+g_{\phi\phi}d\phi^2\,,$$

the nonholonomic orthonormal covectors are therefore

$$\omega_t=\sqrt{g_{tt}}dt\,,\;\;\omega_r=\sqrt{g_{rr}}dr\,,\;\;\omega_\theta=\sqrt{g_{\theta\theta}}d\theta\,,\;\;\omega_\phi=\sqrt{g_{\phi\phi}}d\phi\,,$$

and the nonholonomic null covectors are therefore

$l_adx^a=\frac{1}{\sqrt{2}}(\sqrt{g_{tt}}dt+\sqrt{g_{rr}}dr)\,,$ $n_adx^a=\frac{1}{\sqrt{2}}(\sqrt{g_{tt}}dt-\sqrt{g_{rr}}dr)\,,$
$m_adx^a=\frac{1}{\sqrt{2}}(\sqrt{g_{\theta\theta}}d\theta+i\sqrt{g_{\phi\phi}}d\phi)\,,$ $\bar{m}_adx^a=\frac{1}{\sqrt{2}}(\sqrt{g_{\theta\theta}}d\theta-i\sqrt{g_{\phi\phi}}d\phi)\,.$

== l^{a} (n^{a}) aligned with null radial geodesics ==
In Minkowski spacetime, the nonholonomically constructed null vectors $\{l^a\,,n^a\}$ respectively match the outgoing and ingoing null radial rays. As an extension of this idea in generic curved spacetimes, $\{l^a\,,n^a\}$ can still be aligned with the tangent vector field of null radial congruence. However, this type of adaption only works for $\{t,r,\theta,\phi\}$, $\{u,r,\theta,\phi\}$ or $\{v,r,\theta,\phi\}$ coordinates where the radial behaviors can be well described, with $u$ and $v$ denote the outgoing (retarded) and ingoing (advanced) null coordinate, respectively.

Example: Null tetrad for Schwarzschild metric in Eddington-Finkelstein coordinates reads

$ds^2=-Fdv^2+2dvdr+r^2(d\theta^2+\sin^2\!\theta\,d\phi^2)\,,\;\;\text{with } F\,:=\,\Big(1-\frac{2M}{r} \Big)\,,$

so the Lagrangian for null radial geodesics of the Schwarzschild spacetime is

$L=-F\dot{v}^2+2\dot{v}\dot{r}\,,$

which has an ingoing solution $\dot{v}=0$ and an outgoing solution $\dot{r}=\frac{F}{2}\dot{v}$. Now, one can construct a complex null tetrad which is adapted to the ingoing null radial geodesics:

$l^a=(1,\frac{F}{2},0,0)\,,\quad n^a=(0,-1,0,0)\,,\quad m^a=\frac{1}{\sqrt{2}\,r}(0,0,1,i\,\csc\theta)\,,$

and the dual basis covectors are therefore

$l_a=(-\frac{F}{2},1,0,0)\,,\quad n_a=(-1,0,0,0)\,,\quad m_a=\frac{r}{\sqrt{2}}(0,0,1,i\sin\theta)\,.$

Here we utilized the cross-normalization condition $l^an_a=n^al_a=-1$ as well as the requirement that $g_{ab}+l_an_b+n_al_b$ should span the induced metric $h_{AB}$ for cross-sections of {v=constant, r=constant}, where $dv$ and $dr$ are not mutually orthogonal. Also, the remaining two tetrad (co)vectors are constructed nonholonomically. With the tetrad defined, one is now able to respectively find out the spin coefficients, Weyl-Np scalars and Ricci-NP scalars that

$\kappa=\sigma=\tau=0\,,\quad \nu=\lambda=\pi=0\,,\quad \gamma=0$
$\rho=\frac{-r+2M}{2r^2}\,,\quad \mu=-\frac{1}{r}\,,\quad \alpha=-\beta=\frac{-\sqrt{2}\cot\theta}{4r}\,,\quad \varepsilon=\frac{M}{2r^2}\,;$

$\Psi_0=\Psi_1=\Psi_3=\Psi_4=0\,,\quad \Psi_2=-\frac{M}{r^3}\,,$

$\Phi_{00}=\Phi_{10}=\Phi_{20}=\Phi_{11}=\Phi_{12}=\Phi_{22}=\Lambda=0 \,.$

Example: Null tetrad for extremal Reissner–Nordström metric in Eddington-Finkelstein coordinates reads

$$ds^2=- G dv^2+2dvdr+r^2 d\theta^2+r^2\sin^2\!\theta\,d\phi^2\,,\;\;\text{with } G\,:=\,\Big(1-\frac{M}{r} \Big)^2\,,$$

so the Lagrangian is

$$2L=- G \dot v^2+2\dot v \dot r+r^2 ({\dot\theta}^2+\sin^2\!\theta\,\dot\phi^2)\,.$$

For null radial geodesics with $\{L=0\,,\dot\theta=0\,,\dot\phi=0\}$, there are two solutions

$\dot v=0$ (ingoing) and $\dot r=2F\dot v$ (outgoing),

and therefore the tetrad for an ingoing observer can be set up as

$$l^a\partial_a\,=\, \Big(1\,,\frac{F}{2}\,,0\,,0  \Big)\,,\quad  n^a\partial_a\,=\,\Big(0\,,-1\,,0\,,0  \Big)\,,$$
$$l_adx^a\,=\, \Big(-\frac{F}{2}\,,1\,,0,0  \Big)\,,\quad n_adx^a\,=\,\Big(-1\,,0\,,0\,,0  \Big)\,,$$
$$m^a\partial_a\,=\,\frac{1}{\sqrt{2}}\, \Big(0\,,0\,,\frac{1}{r}\,,\frac{i}{r\sin\theta} \Big)  \,,\quad m_a dx^a\,=\,\frac{r}{\sqrt{2}}\,\Big(0\,,0\,,1\,,i\sin\theta \Big)\,.$$

With the tetrad defined, we are now able to work out the spin coefficients, Weyl-NP scalars and Ricci-NP scalars that

$\kappa=\sigma=\tau=0\,,\quad \nu=\lambda=\pi=0\,,\quad \gamma=0$
$\rho=\frac{(r-M)^2}{2r^3}\,,\quad \mu=-\frac{1}{r}\,,\quad \alpha=-\beta=\frac{-\sqrt{2}\cot\theta}{4r}\,,\quad \varepsilon=\frac{M(r-M)}{2r^3}\,;$

$\Psi_0=\Psi_1=\Psi_3=\Psi_4=0\,,\quad \Psi_2=-\frac{(Mr-M)}{r^4}\,,$

$\Phi_{00}=\Phi_{10}=\Phi_{20}=\Phi_{12}=\Phi_{22}=\Lambda=0 \,,\quad \Phi_{11}=-\frac{M^2}{2r^4} \,.$

== Tetrads adapted to the spacetime structure ==
At some typical boundary regions such as null infinity, timelike infinity, spacelike infinity, black hole horizons and cosmological horizons, null tetrads adapted to spacetime structures are usually employed to achieve the most succinct Newman–Penrose descriptions.

=== Newman-Unti tetrad for null infinity ===
For null infinity, the classic Newman-Unti (NU) tetrad is employed to study asymptotic behaviors at null infinity,

$l^a\partial_a=\partial_r:=D\,,$
$n^a\partial_a=\partial_u +U\partial_r +X\partial_\varsigma+\bar{X} \partial_{\bar \varsigma}:=\Delta\,,$
$m^a\partial_a=\omega\partial_r+\xi^3\partial_\varsigma +\xi^4\partial_{\bar \varsigma}:=\delta\,,$
$\bar{m}^a\partial_a=\bar{\omega}\partial_r+\bar{\xi}^3\partial_{\bar\varsigma} +\bar{\xi}^4\partial_{ \varsigma}:=\bar\delta\,,$

where $\{U, X, \omega, \xi^3, \xi^4\}$ are tetrad functions to be solved. For the NU tetrad, the foliation leaves are parameterized by the outgoing (advanced) null coordinate $u$ with $l_a=du$, and $r$ is the normalized affine coordinate along $l^a$ $(Dr=l^a\partial_ar=1)$; the ingoing null vector $n^a$ acts as the null generator at null infinity with $\Delta u=n^a\partial_a u=1$. The coordinates $\{u,r,\varsigma, \bar{\varsigma}\}$ comprise two real affine coordinates $\{u,r\}$ and two complex stereographic coordinates $\{\varsigma:= e^{i\phi}\cot\frac{\theta}{2}, \bar{\varsigma}=e^{-i\phi}\cot\frac{\theta}{2}\}$, where $\{\theta,\phi\}$ are the usual spherical coordinates on the cross-section $\hat\Delta_u=S^2_u$ (as shown in ref., complex stereographic rather than real isothermal coordinates are used just for the convenience of completely solving NP equations).

Also, for the NU tetrad, the basic gauge conditions are

$\kappa=\pi=\varepsilon=0\,,\quad \rho=\bar\rho\,,\quad \tau=\bar\alpha+\beta\,.$

=== Adapted tetrad for exteriors and near-horizon vicinity of isolated horizons ===
For a more comprehensive view of black holes in quasilocal definitions, adapted tetrads which can be smoothly transited from the exterior to the near-horizon vicinity and to the horizons are required. For example, for isolated horizons describing black holes in equilibrium with their exteriors, such a tetrad and the related coordinates can be constructed this way. Choose the first real null covector $n_a$ as the gradient of foliation leaves

$n_a\,=-dv \,,$
where $v$ is the ingoing (retarded) Eddington–Finkelstein-type null coordinate, which labels the foliation cross-sections and acts as an affine parameter with regard to the outgoing null vector field $l^a\partial_a$, i.e.

$Dv=1 \,,\quad \Delta v=\delta v=\bar\delta v=0\,.$
Introduce the second coordinate $r$ as an affine parameter along the ingoing null vector field $n^a$, which obeys the normalization

$n^a\partial_a r \,=\,-1 \; \Leftrightarrow\; n^a\partial_a \,=\, -\partial_r\,.$

Now, the first real null tetrad vector $n^a$ is fixed. To determine the remaining tetrad vectors $\{l^a,m^a,\bar m^a\}$ and their covectors, besides the basic cross-normalization conditions, it is also required that: (i) the outgoing null normal field $l^a$ acts as the null generators; (ii) the null frame (covectors) $\{l_a, n_a, m_a, \bar m_a\}$ are parallelly propagated along $n^a\partial_a$; (iii) $\{m^a,\bar m^a\}$ spans the {t=constant, r=constant} cross-sections which are labeled by real isothermal coordinates $\{y,z\}$.

Tetrads satisfying the above restrictions can be expressed in the general form that

$l^a\partial_a=\partial_v +U\partial_r +X^3\partial_y+X^4 \partial_{ z }\, := \,D \,,$
$n^a\partial_a=-\partial_r\, := \,\Delta \,,$
$m^a\partial_a=\Omega\partial_r+\xi^3\partial_y +\xi^4\partial_{ z } \, := \,\delta \,,$
$\bar{m}^a\partial_a=\bar{\Omega}\partial_r +\bar{\xi}^3\partial_{ y}+\bar{\xi}^4\partial_{ z } \, := \,\bar\delta \,.$

The gauge conditions in this tetrad are

$\nu=\tau=\gamma=0\,,\quad \mu=\bar\mu\,,\quad \pi=\alpha+\bar\beta\,,$

Remark: Unlike Schwarzschild-type coordinates, here r=0 represents the horizon, while r>0 (r<0) corresponds to the exterior (interior) of an isolated horizon. People often Taylor expand a scalar $Q$ function with respect to the horizon r=0,

$Q=\sum_{i=0} Q^{(i)}r^i=Q^{(0)}+Q^{(1)}r+\cdots +Q^{(n)}r^n+\ldots$

where $Q^{(0)}$ refers to its on-horizon value. The very coordinates used in the adapted tetrad above are actually the Gaussian null coordinates employed in studying near-horizon geometry and mechanics of black holes.

== See also ==
- Newman–Penrose formalism
