= Einstein Prize (APS) =

- Awarded for: To recognize outstanding accomplishments in the field of gravitational physics.
- Location: College Park, Maryland
- Country: United States
- Hosted by: American Physical Society
- Reward: $10,000
- First award: 2003
- Website: Einstein Prize

Since 2003, the Einstein Prize is a biennial prize awarded by the American Physical Society. The recipients are chosen for their outstanding accomplishments in the field of gravitational physics. The prize is named after Albert Einstein (1879–1955), author of the special and general theories of relativity. The prize was established by the Topical Group on Gravitation at the beginning of 1999. As of 2013, the prize is valued at $10,000. The 2005 prize for Bryce DeWitt was announced shortly before his death, and awarded posthumously.

== Recipients ==
Year	Recipient(s)	Citation	Ref
2003	John A. Wheeler	For pioneering investigations in general relativity, including gravitational radiation, quantum gravity, black holes, space time singularities, and symmetries in Einstein's equations, and for leadership and inspiration to generations of researchers in general relativity.	
2003	Peter G. Bergmann	For pioneering investigations in general relativity, including gravitational radiation, quantum gravity, black holes, space time singularities, and symmetries in Einstein's equations, and for leadership and inspiration to generations of researchers in general relativity.	
2005	Bryce DeWitt	For a broad range of original contributions to gravitational physics, especially in quantum gravity, gauge field theories, radiation reaction in curved spacetime, and numerical relativity; and for inspiring a generation of students.	
2007	Rainer Weiss	For fundamental contributions to the development of gravitational wave detectors based on optical interferometry, leading to the successful operation of the Laser Interferometer Gravitational Wave Observatory.	
2007	Ronald Drever	For fundamental contributions to the development of gravitational wave detectors based on optical interferometry, leading to the successful operation of the Laser Interferometer Gravitational Wave Observatory.	
2009	James Hartle	For a broad range of fundamental contributions to relativistic stars, quantum fields in curved spacetime, and especially quantum cosmology.	
2011	Ezra Ted Newman	For outstanding contributions to theoretical relativity, including the Newman–Penrose formalism, Kerr–Newman solution, Heaven, and null foliation theory. For his intellectual passion, generosity and honesty, which have inspired and represented a model for generations of relativists.	
2013	Irwin I. Shapiro	For his contributions to experimental Solar System tests of relativistic theories of gravity, and in particular for proposing and measuring the Shapiro time delay effect.	
2015	Jacob Bekenstein	For his ground-breaking work on black hole entropy, which launched the field of black hole thermodynamics and transformed the long effort to unify quantum mechanics and gravitation.	
2017	Robert M. Wald	For fundamental contributions to classical and semiclassical gravity studies, in particular, the discovery of the general formula for black hole entropy, and for developing a rigorous formulation of quantum field theory in curved spacetime.	
2019	Abhay Ashtekar	For numerous and seminal contributions to general relativity, including the theory of black holes, canonical quantum gravity, and quantum cosmology.	
2021	Clifford Martin Will	For outstanding contributions to observational tests of general relativity with theories of gravitational waves, astrophysical black holes, and neutron stars.	
2021	Saul Teukolsky	For outstanding contributions to observational tests of general relativity with theories of gravitational waves, astrophysical black holes, and neutron stars.	
2023	Gary T. Horowitz	For fundamental contributions to classical gravity and gravitational aspects of string theory.	
2025	Eric G. Adelberger	For outstanding contributions to experimental gravity using precision torsion-balance measurements, which have profound implications for fundamental physics.	

== See also ==
- Albert Einstein Award, (Lewis and Rosa Strauss Memorial Fund)
- Albert Einstein Medal, (Albert Einstein Society, Bern)
- Albert Einstein World Award of Science, (World Cultural Council)
- List of physics awards
