= Ezra T. Newman =

American physicist (1929–2021)

Ezra Ted Newman
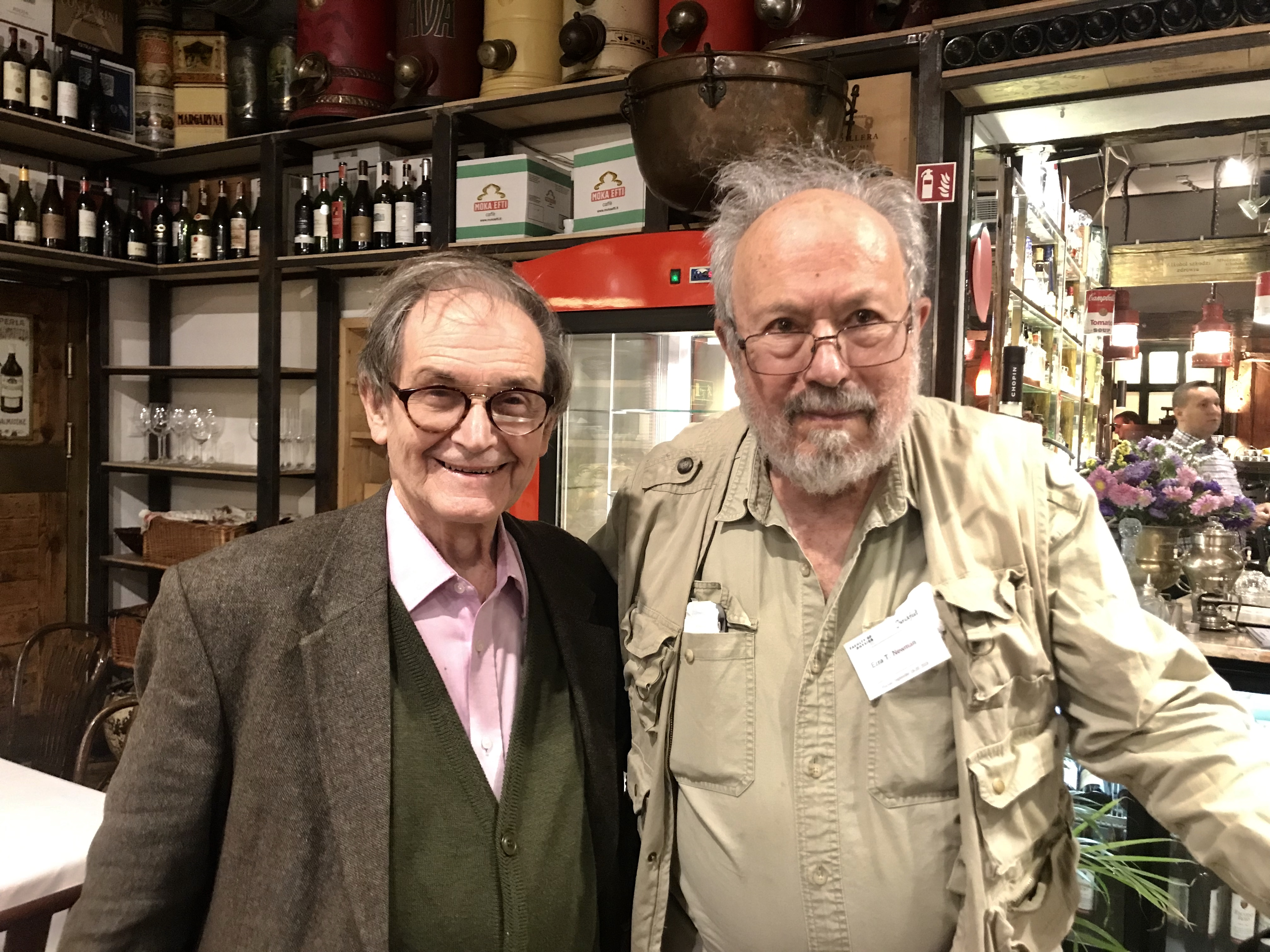
- Roger Penrose with Newman (right) in 2019
- Born: Ezra Theodore Newman; October 17, 1929; Bronx, New York, U.S.
- Died: March 24, 2021 (aged 91); Pittsburgh, Pennsylvania, U.S.
- Education: The Bronx H.S. of Science; New York University; Syracuse University
- Known for: Newman–Penrose formalism Kerr–Newman metric
- Scientific career
- Fields: General relativity
- Workplaces: University of Pittsburgh
- Thesis: Observables in singular theories by systematic approximation. (1956)
- Doctoral advisor: Peter Bergmann

Ezra Theodore Newman (October 17, 1929 – March 24, 2021) was an American physicist, known for his many contributions to general relativity theory. He was professor emeritus at the University of Pittsburgh. Newman was awarded the 2011 Einstein Prize from the American Physical Society.

== Education ==
Newman was born in the Bronx, New York City to David and Fannie (Slutsky) Newman. He showed an early interest in science, pondering magnets, match flames, and science books.

He was admitted to the Bronx High School of Science, where he excelled at physics. Ted's father hoped that he would follow him into dentistry, but instead Ted enrolled at New York University to further his study of physics, graduating with a B.A. in 1951. For graduate education he went to Syracuse University, obtaining an M.A. in 1955 and a Ph.D. the following year.

== Career in physics ==
Newman joined the University of Pittsburgh faculty in 1956, becoming professor of physics in 1966. He was a visiting professor at Syracuse University in 1960/61 and at King's College London, in 1964/65. In 1957 he served as consultant at Wright-Patterson Air Force Base.

In 1962, together with Roger Penrose, he introduced the powerful Newman–Penrose formalism for working with spinorial quantities in general relativity. The following year he and coworkers extended Abraham H. Taub's solution to the Einstein field equation obtaining the Taub–NUT space. He also generalized the Kerr metric developed by Roy Kerr to include a charged body, resulting in the Kerr–Newman metric.

In 1973 he advocated the use of complex numbers in relativity, and consideration of complex spacetime.

Some of his most interesting recent work has involved the problem of reconstructing the gravitational field within some region from observations of how optical images are lensed as light rays pass through the region.

In 2002 an email he forwarded to John C. Baez helped to touch off the Bogdanov Affair.

Newman was selected as a Fellow of the American Physical Society in 1972. In 2011, he was awarded the Einstein Prize (APS) "for outstanding contributions to theoretical relativity, including the Newman–Penrose formalism, Kerr–Newman solution, Heaven, and null foliation theory, for his intellectual passion, generosity and honesty, which have inspired and represented a model for generations of relativists".

== Family ==
Newman married Sally Faskow on April 20, 1958, with whom he had two children, David E. Newman, a professor of physics at the University of Alaska Fairbanks, and Dara Newman.

== Selected publications ==
- Frittelli, Simonetta; Kling, Thomas P.; Newman, Ezra T. (2000). "Image distortion from optical scalars in non perturbative gravitational lensing". Physical Review D. 63 (2) 023007. arXiv:gr-qc/0011108. Bibcode:2000PhRvD..63b3007F. doi:10.1103/PhysRevD.63.023007. S2CID 38841368.
- Newman, E. T.; Couch, E.; Chinnapared, K.; Exton, A.; Prakash, A.; Torrence, R. J. (1965). "Metric of a rotating charged mass". J. Math. Phys. 6 (6): 918. Bibcode:1965JMP.....6..918N. doi:10.1063/1.1704351.
- Newman, E. T.; Penrose, R. (1962). "An approach to gravitational radiation by a method of spin coefficients". J. Math. Phys. 3 (3): 566. Bibcode:1962JMP.....3..566N. doi:10.1063/1.1724257.
