= Complex spacetime =

Spacetime with complexified coordinates

Complex spacetime is a mathematical framework that combines the concepts of complex numbers and spacetime in physics. In this framework, the usual real-valued coordinates of spacetime are replaced with complex-valued coordinates. This allows for inclusion of imaginary components in the description of spacetime, which can have interesting implications in certain areas of physics, such as quantum field theory and string theory.

The notion is entirely mathematical with no physics implied, but should be seen as a tool, for instance, as exemplified by the Wick rotation.

== Real and complex spaces ==
=== Mathematics ===
The complexification of a real vector space results in a complex vector space (over the complex number field). To "complexify" a space means extending ordinary scalar multiplication of vectors by real numbers to scalar multiplication by complex numbers. For complexified inner product spaces, the complex inner product on vectors replaces the ordinary real-valued inner product, an example of the latter being the dot product.

In mathematical physics, when we complexify a real coordinate space $\mathbb{R}^n$ we create a complex coordinate space $\mathbb{C}^n$, referred to in differential geometry as a "complex manifold". The space $\mathbb{C}^n$ can be related to $\mathbb{R}^{2n}$, since every complex number constitutes two real numbers.

A complex spacetime geometry refers to the metric tensor being complex, not spacetime itself.

=== Physics ===
The Minkowski space of special relativity (SR) and general relativity (GR) is a 4-dimensional pseudo-Euclidean space. The spacetime underlying Albert Einstein's field equations, which mathematically describe gravitation, is a real 4-dimensional pseudo-Riemannian manifold.

In quantum mechanics, wave functions describing particles are complex-valued functions of real space and time variables. The set of all wavefunctions for a given system is an infinite-dimensional complex Hilbert space.

== History ==
The notion of spacetime having more than four dimensions is of interest in its own mathematical right. Its appearance in physics can be rooted to attempts of unifying the fundamental interactions, originally gravity and electromagnetism. These ideas prevail in string theory and beyond. The idea of complex spacetime has received considerably less attention, but it has been considered in conjunction with the Lorentz–Dirac equation and the Maxwell equations. Other ideas include mapping real spacetime into a complex representation space of SU(2, 2), see twistor theory.

In 1919, Theodor Kaluza posted his 5-dimensional extension of general relativity to Albert Einstein, who was impressed with how the equations of electromagnetism emerged from Kaluza's theory. In 1926, Oskar Klein suggested that Kaluza's extra dimension might be "curled up" into an extremely small circle, as if a circular topology is hidden within every point in space. Instead of being another spatial dimension, the extra dimension could be thought of as an angle, which created a hyper-dimension as it spun through 360°. This 5d theory is named Kaluza–Klein theory.

In 1932, Hsin P. Soh of MIT, advised by Arthur Eddington, published a theory attempting to unify gravitation and electromagnetism within a complex 4-dimensional Riemannian geometry. The line element ds^{2} is complex-valued, so that the real part corresponds to mass and gravitation, while the imaginary part with charge and electromagnetism. The usual space x, y, z and time t coordinates themselves are real and spacetime is not complex, but tangent spaces are allowed to be.

For several decades after Einstein published his general theory of relativity in 1915, he tried to unify gravity with electromagnetism to create a unified field theory explaining both interactions. In the latter years of World War II, Einstein began considering complex spacetime geometries of various kinds.

In 1953, Wolfgang Pauli generalised the Kaluza–Klein theory to a six-dimensional space, and (using dimensional reduction) derived the essentials of an SU(2) gauge theory (applied in quantum mechanics to the electroweak interaction), as if Klein's "curled up" circle had become the surface of an infinitesimal hypersphere.

In 1975, Jerzy Plebanski published "Some Solutions of Complex Albert Einstein Equations".

There have been attempts to formulate the Abraham–Lorentz force in complex spacetime by analytic continuation.

== See also ==
- Construction of a complex null tetrad
- Four-vector
- Hilbert space
- Twistor space
- Spherical basis
- Riemann–Silberstein vector
