= Ronald Drever =

British physicist (1931–2017)

Ron Drever
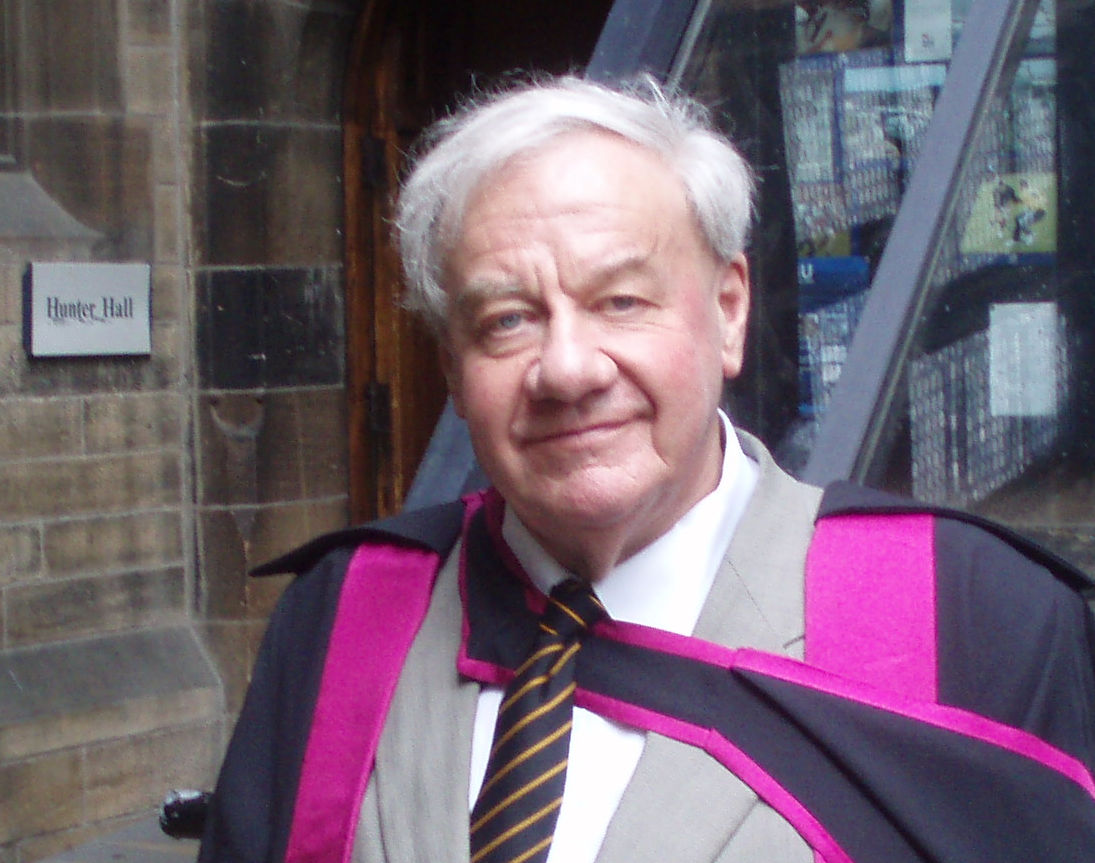
- Drever in Glasgow 2007
- Born: Ronald William Prest Drever; 26 October 1931; Bishopton, Renfrewshire, Scotland, UK
- Died: 7 March 2017 (aged 85); Edinburgh, Scotland, UK
- Education: University of Glasgow (PhD)
- Known for: Laser stabilizing technique Pioneering laser interferometric gravitational wave observation.
- Awards: Einstein Prize (2007); Special Breakthrough Prize in Fundamental Physics (2016); Gruber Prize in Cosmology (2016); Shaw Prize (2016); Kavli Prize (2016); Smithsonian, American Ingenuity Award (2016); Harvey Prize (2016)
- Scientific career
- Fields: Physics, Laser physics, Experimental Gravitation
- Workplaces: California Institute of Technology, University of Glasgow
- Thesis: Studies of orbital electron capture using proportional counters (1959)
- Doctoral students: James Hough
- Website: www.pma.caltech.edu/content/ronald-w-drever

Ronald William Prest Drever (26 October 1931 – 7 March 2017) was a Scottish experimental physicist. He was a professor emeritus at the California Institute of Technology, co-founded the LIGO project, and was a co-inventor of the Pound–Drever–Hall technique for laser stabilisation, as well as the Hughes–Drever experiment. This work was instrumental in the first detection of gravitational waves in September 2015.

Drever died on 7 March 2017, aged 85, seven months before his colleagues Rainer Weiss, Kip Thorne, and Barry Barish won the Nobel Prize in Physics for their work on the observation of gravitational waves. The trio of Drever, Thorne and Weiss shared several major physics prizes in 2016, so it is widely believed that Drever would have won the Nobel Prize in the place of Barry Barish had he not died before the Nobel Committee made their decision.

== Education ==
Drever was educated at Glasgow Academy followed by University of Glasgow where he was awarded a bachelor's degree in 1953 followed by a PhD in 1959 for research on orbital electron capture using proportional counters.

== Career and research ==
After receiving his PhD from the University of Glasgow in 1959, Drever initiated the Glasgow project to detect gravitational waves in the sixties, after which he established the University’s first dedicated gravitational wave research group in 1970. The same year Drever was recruited to form a gravitational wave program at Caltech. In 1984 Drever left Glasgow to work full-time at Caltech.

Drever's contributions to the design and implementation of the LIGO interferometers were critically important to their ability to function in the extreme sensitivity realm required for detection of gravitational waves (10^{−23} strain).

Drever's final work involved the development of magnetically levitated optical tables for seismic isolation of experimental apparatus.

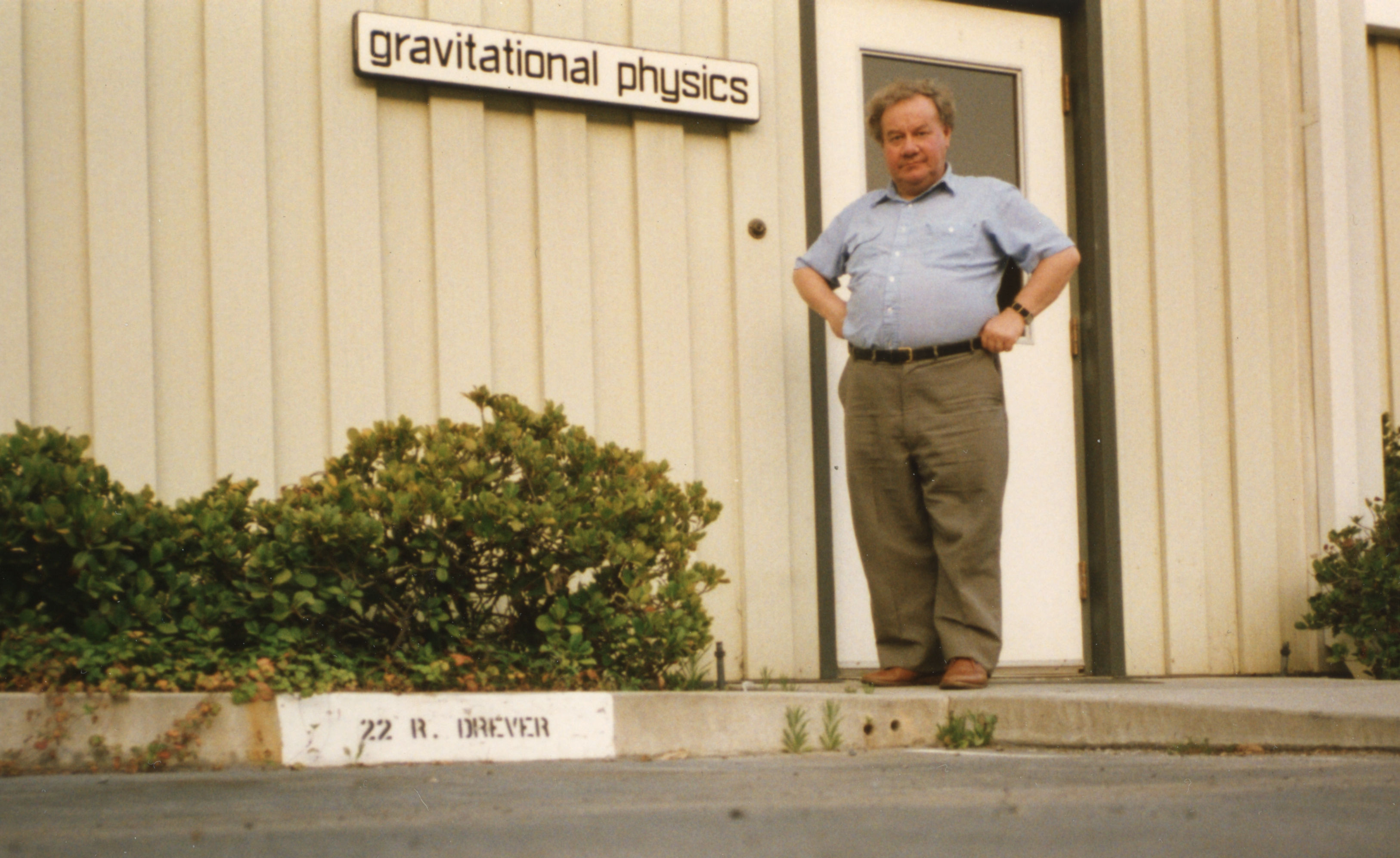
Ronald Drever outside his first laboratory at Caltech. Photo taken in 1993

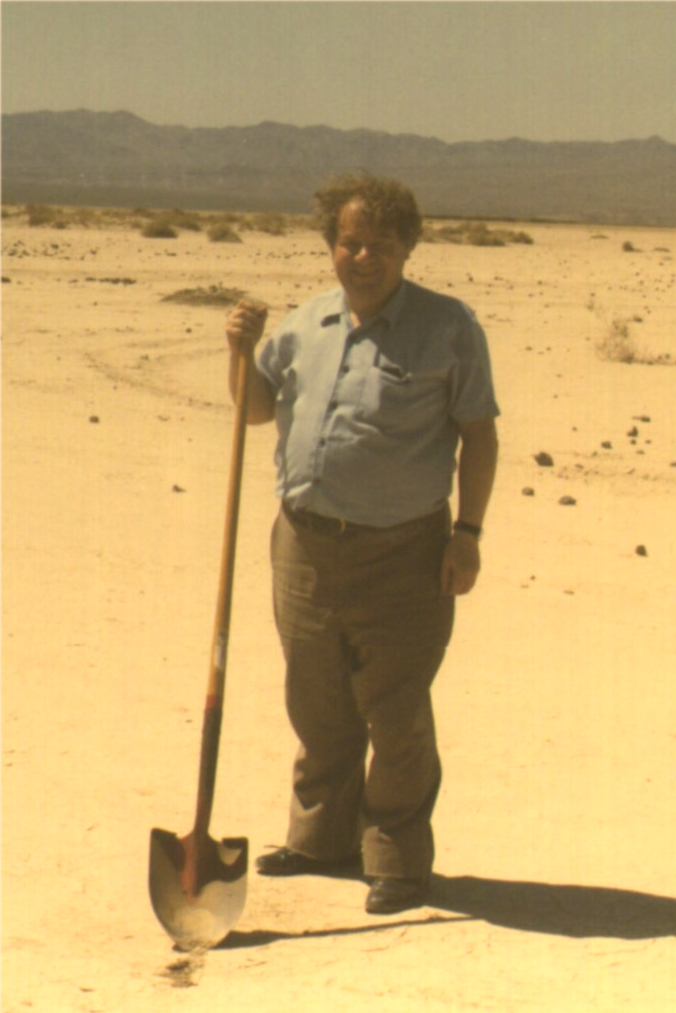
Ronald Drever deciding where to build the LIGO Hanford site 1993

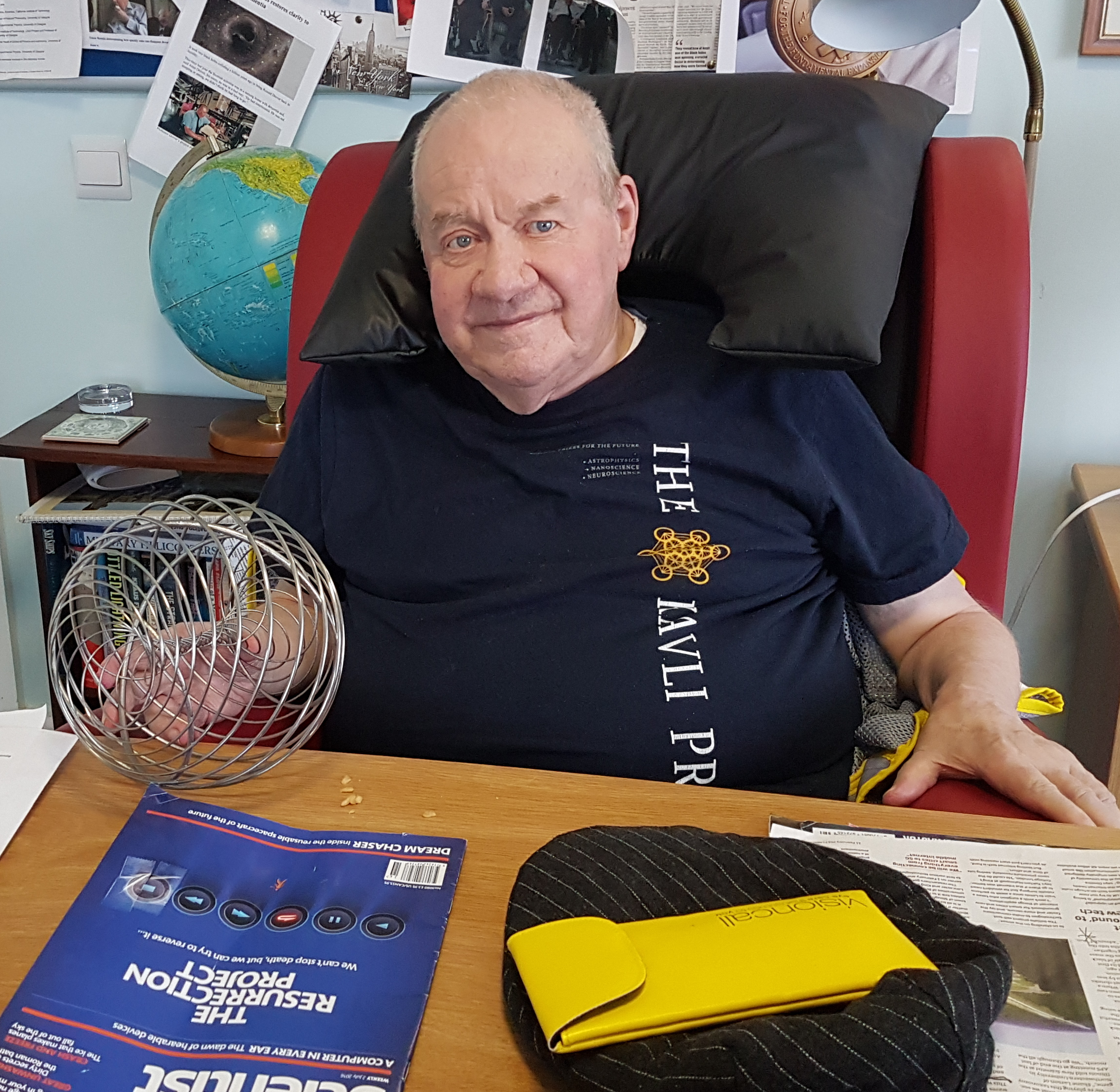
Ronald Drever, with the Breakthrough Prize 2017

=== Honors and awards ===
Drever was recognized by numerous awards including:

- Fellowship of the American Physical Society (1998)
- Inducted into the American Academy of Arts and Sciences (2002)
- Shared the Einstein Prize (2007) with Rainer Weiss
- The Special Breakthrough Prize in Fundamental Physics (2016)
- The Gruber Prize in Cosmology (2016)
- The Shaw Prize (2016) (together with Kip Thorne and Rainer Weiss).
- The Kavli Prize in Astrophysics (2016).
- Smithsonian, American Ingenuity Award (2016)
- The Harvey Prize (2016)
- Fellowship of the Norwegian Academy of Science and Letters

== Personal life ==
Ronald was a paternal cousin to cartographer and writer, Tim Robinson and paternal uncle of acoustic ecologist, John Levack Drever.
