= Ricci scalars (Newman–Penrose formalism) =

Components of Ricci tensors

In the Newman–Penrose (NP) formalism of general relativity, independent components of the Ricci tensors of a four-dimensional spacetime are encoded into seven (or ten) Ricci scalars which consist of three real scalars $\{\Phi_{00}, \Phi_{11}, \Phi_{22}\}$, three (or six) complex scalars $\{\Phi_{01}=\overline{\Phi}_{10}\,,\Phi_{02}=\overline{\Phi}_{20}\,,\Phi_{12}=\overline{\Phi}_{21}\}$ and the NP curvature scalar $\Lambda$. Physically, Ricci-NP scalars are related with the energy–momentum distribution of the spacetime due to Einstein's field equation.

== Definitions ==
Given a complex null tetrad $\{l^a, n^a, m^a, \bar{m}^a\}$ and with the convention $\{(-,+,+,+); l^a n_a=-1\,,m^a \bar{m}_a=1\}$, the Ricci-NP scalars are defined by (where overline means complex conjugate)

$\Phi_{00}:=\frac{1}{2}R_{ab}l^a l^b\,, \quad \Phi_{11}:=\frac{1}{4}R_{ab}(\,l^a n^b+m^a\bar{m}^b)\,, \quad\Phi_{22}:=\frac{1}{2}R_{ab}n^a n^b\,, \quad\Lambda:=\frac{R}{24}\,;$

$\Phi_{01}:=\frac{1}{2}R_{ab}l^a m^b\,, \quad\; \Phi_{10}:=\frac{1}{2}R_{ab}l^a \bar{m}^b=\overline{\Phi}_{01}\,,$
$\Phi_{02}:=\frac{1}{2}R_{ab}m^a m^b\,, \quad \Phi_{20}:=\frac{1}{2}R_{ab}\bar{m}^a \bar{m}^b=\overline{\Phi}_{02}\,,$
$\Phi_{12}:=\frac{1}{2}R_{ab}m^a n^b\,, \quad\; \Phi_{21}:=\frac{1}{2}R_{ab}\bar{m}^a n^b=\overline{\Phi}_{12}\,.$

Remark I: In these definitions, $R_{ab}$ could be replaced by its trace-free part $Q_{ab}=R_{ab}-\frac{1}{4}g_{ab}R$ or by the Einstein tensor $G_{ab}=R_{ab}-\frac{1}{2}g_{ab}R$ because of the normalization (i.e. inner product) relations that

$$l_a l^a = n_a n^a = m_a m^a = \bar{m}_a \bar{m}^a=0\,,$$
$$l_a m^a = l_a \bar{m}^a = n_a m^a = n_a \bar{m}^a=0\,.$$

Remark II: Specifically for electrovacuum, we have $\Lambda=0$, thus

$24\Lambda\,=0=\,R_{ab}g^{ab}\,=\,R_{ab}\Big(-2l^a n^b+2m^a\bar{m}^b \Big)\; \Rightarrow \; R_{ab}l^a n^b\,=\,R_{ab}m^a\bar{m}^b\,,$

and therefore $\Phi_{11}$ is reduced to

$\Phi_{11}:=\frac{1}{4}R_{ab}(\,l^a n^b+m^a\bar{m}^b)=\frac{1}{2}R_{ab}l^a n^b=\frac{1}{2}R_{ab}m^a\bar{m}^b\,.$

Remark III: If one adopts the convention $\{(+,-,-,-); l^a n_a=1\,,m^a \bar{m}_a=-1\}$, the definitions of $\Phi_{ij}$ should take the opposite values; that is to say, $\Phi_{ij}\mapsto-\Phi_{ij}$ after the signature transition.

== Alternative derivations ==
According to the definitions above, one should find out the Ricci tensors before calculating the Ricci-NP scalars via contractions with the corresponding tetrad vectors. However, this method fails to fully reflect the spirit of Newman–Penrose formalism and alternatively, one could compute the spin coefficients and then derive the Ricci-NP scalars $\Phi_{ij}$ via relevant NP field equations that

$$\Phi_{00}=D\rho -\bar{\delta}\kappa-(\rho^2+\sigma\bar{\sigma})-(\varepsilon+\bar{\varepsilon})\rho+\bar{\kappa}\tau+\kappa(3\alpha+\bar{\beta}-\pi)\,,$$
$$\Phi_{10}=D\alpha-\bar{\delta}\varepsilon-(\rho+\bar{\varepsilon}-2\varepsilon)\alpha-\beta\bar{\sigma}+\bar{\beta}\varepsilon+\kappa\lambda+\bar{\kappa}\gamma-(\varepsilon+\rho)\pi\,,$$
$$\Phi_{02}=\delta\tau-\Delta\sigma-(\mu\sigma+\bar{\lambda}\rho)-(\tau+\beta-\bar{\alpha})\tau+(3\gamma-\bar{\gamma})\sigma+\kappa\bar{\nu}\,,$$
$$\Phi_{20}=D\lambda-\bar{\delta}\pi-(\rho\lambda+\bar{\sigma}\mu)-\pi^2-(\alpha-\bar{\beta})\pi+\nu\bar{\kappa}+(3\varepsilon-\bar{\varepsilon})\lambda\,,$$
$$\Phi_{12}=\delta\gamma-\Delta\beta-(\tau-\bar{\alpha}-\beta)\gamma-\mu\tau+\sigma\nu+\varepsilon\bar{\nu}+(\gamma-\bar{\gamma}-\mu)\beta-\alpha\bar{\lambda}\,,$$
$$\Phi_{22}=\delta\nu-\Delta\mu-(\mu^2+\lambda\bar{\lambda})-(\gamma+\bar{\gamma})\mu+\bar{\nu}\pi-(\tau-3\beta-\bar{\alpha})\nu\,,$$
$$2\Phi_{11}=D\gamma-\Delta\varepsilon+\delta\alpha-\bar{\delta}\beta-(\tau+\bar{\pi})\alpha-\alpha\bar{\alpha}-(\bar{\tau}+\pi)\beta-\beta\bar{\beta}+2\alpha\beta+(\varepsilon+\bar{\varepsilon})\gamma-(\rho-\bar{\rho})\gamma+(\gamma+\bar{\gamma})\varepsilon-(\mu-\bar{\mu})\varepsilon-\tau\pi+\nu\kappa-(\mu\rho-\lambda\sigma)\,,$$

while the NP curvature scalar $\Lambda$ could be directly and easily calculated via $\Lambda=\frac{R}{24}$ with $R$ being the ordinary scalar curvature of the spacetime metric $g_{ab}=-l_a n_b - n_a l_b +m_a \bar{m}_b +\bar{m}_a m_b$.

== Electromagnetic Ricci-NP scalars ==
According to the definitions of Ricci-NP scalars $\Phi_{ij}$ above and the fact that $R_{ab}$ could be replaced by $G_{ab}$ in the definitions, $\Phi_{ij}$ are related with the energy–momentum distribution due to Einstein's field equations $G_{ab}=8\pi T_{ab}$. In the simplest situation, i.e. vacuum spacetime in the absence of matter fields with $T_{ab}=0$, we will have $\Phi_{ij}=0$. Moreover, for electromagnetic field, in addition to the aforementioned definitions, $\Phi_{ij}$ could be determined more specifically by

$\Phi_{ij}=\,2\,\phi_i\,\overline{\phi}_j\,,\quad (i,j\in\{0,1,2\})\,,$

where $\phi_i$ denote the three complex Maxwell-NP scalars which encode the six independent components of the Faraday-Maxwell 2-form $F_{ab}$ (i.e. the electromagnetic field strength tensor)

$\phi_0:= -F_{ab}l^a m^b \,,\quad \phi_1:= -\frac{1}{2} F_{ab}\big(l^an^a-m^a\bar{m}^b \big)\,, \quad \phi_2 := F_{ab} n^a \bar{m}^b\,.$

Remark: The equation $\Phi_{ij}=2\,\phi_i\, \overline{\phi}_j$ for electromagnetic field is however not necessarily valid for other kinds of matter fields. For example, in the case of Yang–Mills fields there will be $\Phi_{ij}=\,\text{Tr}\,(\digamma_i \,\bar{\digamma}_j)$ where $\digamma_i (i\in\{0,1,2 \})$ are Yang–Mills-NP scalars.

== See also ==
- Newman–Penrose formalism
- Weyl scalar
