= Null dust solution =

Concept in mathematical physics

In mathematical physics, a null dust solution (sometimes called a null fluid) is a Lorentzian manifold in which the Einstein tensor is null. Such a spacetime can be interpreted as an exact solution of Einstein's field equation, in which the only mass–energy present in the spacetime is due to some kind of massless radiation.

== Mathematical definition ==
By definition, the Einstein tensor of a null dust solution has the form $G^{ab} = 8 \pi \Phi \, k^{a} \, k^{b}$ where $\vec{k}$ is a null vector field. This definition makes sense purely geometrically, but if we place a stress–energy tensor on our spacetime of the form $T^{ab} = \Phi \, k^{a} \, k^{b}$, then Einstein's field equation is satisfied, and such a stress–energy tensor has a clear physical interpretation in terms of massless radiation. The vector field $\vec k$ specifies the direction in which the radiation is moving; the scalar multiplier $\Phi$ specifies its intensity.

== Physical interpretation ==
Physically speaking, a null dust describes either gravitational radiation, or some kind of nongravitational radiation which is described by a relativistic classical field theory (such as electromagnetic radiation), or a combination of these two. Null dusts include vacuum solutions as a special case.

Phenomena which can be modeled by null dust solutions include:

- a beam of neutrinos assumed for simplicity to be massless (treated according to classical physics),
- a very high-frequency electromagnetic wave,
- a beam of incoherent electromagnetic radiation.

In particular, a plane wave of incoherent electromagnetic radiation is a linear superposition of plane waves, all moving in the same direction but having randomly chosen phases and frequencies. (Even though the Einstein field equation is nonlinear, a linear superposition of comoving plane waves is possible.) Here, each electromagnetic plane wave has a well defined frequency and phase, but the superposition does not. Individual electromagnetic plane waves are modeled by null electrovacuum solutions, while an incoherent mixture can be modeled by a null dust.

== Einstein tensor ==
The components of a tensor computed with respect to a frame field rather than the coordinate basis are often called physical components, because these are the components which can (in principle) be measured by an observer.

In the case of a null dust solution, an adapted frame

$$\vec{e}_0, \; \vec{e}_1, \; \vec{e}_2,  \; \vec{e}_3$$

(a timelike unit vector field and three spacelike unit vector fields, respectively) can always be found in which the Einstein tensor has a particularly simple appearance:

$$G^{\hat{a}\hat{b}} = 8 \pi \epsilon \, \left[ \begin{matrix} 1 & 0 & 0 & \pm 1 \\ 0 & 0 & 0 & 0 \\ 0 & 0 & 0 & 0 \\ \pm1 & 0 & 0 & 1 \end{matrix} \right]$$

Here, $\vec{e}_0$ is everywhere tangent to the world lines of our adapted observers, and these observers measure the energy density of the incoherent radiation to be $\epsilon$.

From the form of the general coordinate basis expression given above, it is apparent that the stress–energy tensor has precisely the same isotropy group as the null vector field $\vec{k}$. It is generated by two parabolic Lorentz transformations (pointing in the $\vec{e}_3$ direction) and one rotation (about the $\vec{e}_3$ axis), and it is isometric to the three-dimensional Lie group $E(2)$, the isometry group of the euclidean plane.

== Examples ==
Null dust solutions include two large and important families of exact solutions:

- pp-wave spacetimes (which model generalizations of the plane waves familiar from electromagnetism),
- Robinson–Trautman null dusts (which model radiation expanding from a radiating object).

The pp-waves include the gravitational plane waves and the monochromatic electromagnetic plane wave. A specific example of considerable interest is

- the Bonnor beam, an exact solution modeling an infinitely long beam of light surrounded by a vacuum region.

Robinson–Trautman null dusts include the Kinnersley–Walker photon rocket solutions, which include the Vaidya null dust, which includes the Schwarzschild vacuum.

== See also ==
- Vaidya metric
- Lorentz group
