= Prahalad Chunnilal Vaidya =

Indian physicist and mathematician (1918-2010)

Prahladbhai Chunilal Vaidya
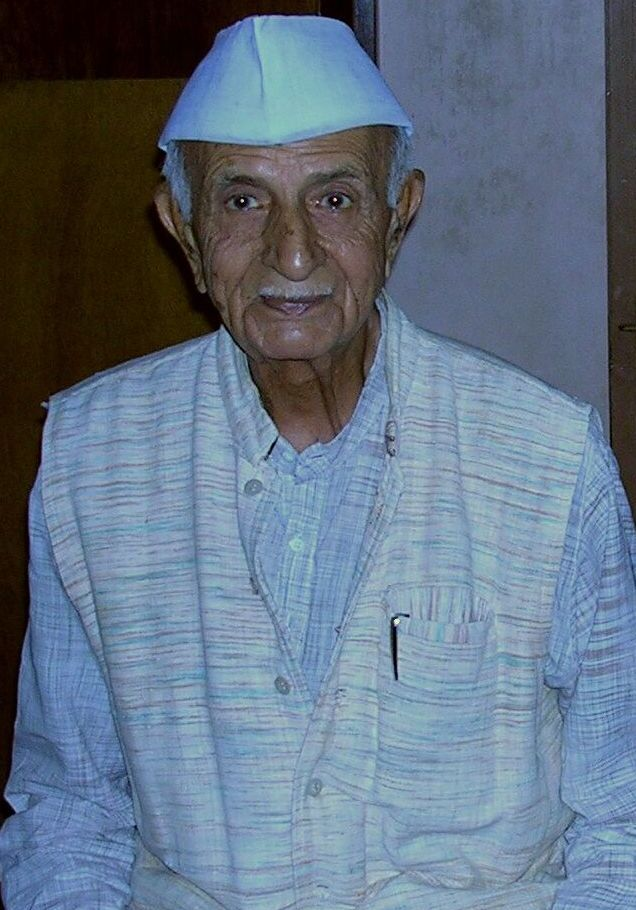
- Professor P. C. Vaidya
- Born: 23 May 1918; Shahpur, Junagadh, Gujarat, India
- Died: 12 March 2010 (aged 91); Ahmedabad, Gujarat, India
- Citizenship: India
- Known for: Vaidya Metric; Vaidya–Patel solution Einstein field equations
- Spouse: Vidyadevi Vaidya
- Scientific career
- Fields: Physics, Mathematics
- Institutions: Banaras Hindu University Varanasi India; Tata Institute of Fundamental Research; V.V. Nagar Science College; Visnagar Science College; Gujarat University

Prahalad Chunnilal Vaidya (P.C.Vaidya; 23 May 1918 – 12 March 2010), was an Indian physicist and mathematician, renowned for his instrumental work in the general theory of relativity. Apart from his scientific career, he was also an educationist and a follower of Gandhian philosophy in post-independence India, specifically in his domicile state Gujarat.

== Early life ==
P. C. Vaidya was born in Shahpur of Junagadh district, Gujarat, India on 23 May 1918.

He completed most of his schooling in Bhavnagar, and went to Mumbai (formerly known as Bombay) for higher studies. There, after finishing high school at Ismail Yusuf College, he joined the Institute of Science (then known as Royal Institute of Science) in Mumbai. He received a BSc degree, majoring in Mathematics and Physics. He completed a MSc degree with Applied Mathematics major.

Vaidya's first stint at teaching was at the Dharmendra Singhji College in Rajkot, where he joined as a lecturer in 1940, soon after completing his MSc examinations. Vaidya taught trigonometry and arithmetic to undergraduate students. The college was then managed by the St Xavier's College, Bombay for half the term, after which the royal family of Rajkot under His Highness Pradyumansinhji Lakhajirajsinhji, the 14th Thakore Saheb of Rajkot, took control of the college. Due to differences with the new management, Vaidya resigned in 1941 and subsequently started with freedom fighter Prithvi Singh Azad at the Ahimsak Vyayam Sangh institute of physical education, where he was the principal for non-violent struggle training programme for youths. Meanwhile, he continued teaching mathematics by conducting private tuition for school students.

In 1942, P. C. Vaidya wrote to Professor Vishnu Vasudev Narlikar, father of Indian physicist Jayant Narlikar, expressing his desire to study relativity. Narlikar approved this, and Vaidya immediately moved to Banaras Hindu University(BHU), Varanasi, where Narlikar was a faculty member at the school of relativity. Vaidya was at Banaras for about ten months.

At that time, India's freedom struggle was at full steam with Mahatma Gandhi leading the Quit India movement. The political situation was also chaotic due to World War II. Vaidya was living with his wife Vidya and six-month-old daughter Kumud and surviving solely on his earlier savings. Gandhi went on a prolonged fast then, which led to a period of great uncertainty as the fast had affected his health adversely. Desperate to know the developments, Vaidya would eagerly await the Hindi evening daily Aaj. Amid the tension, the idea of spacetime geometry sprouted in his mind. Within a week, Vaidya came up with the Vaidya Metric.

Professor Vaidya obtained his Doctoral degree (PhD) in mathematics in 1949.

== Career ==
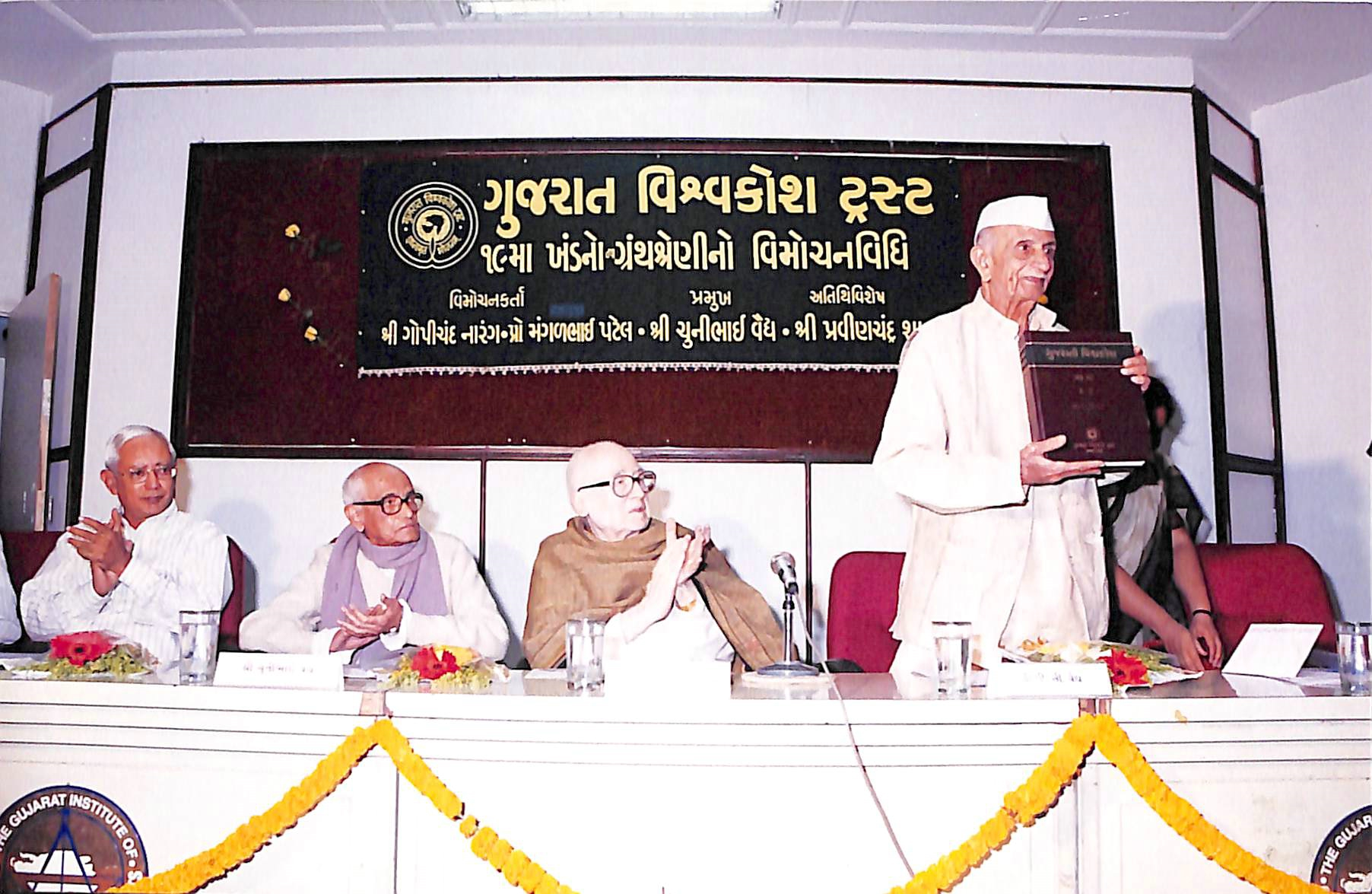
Vaidya inaugurating 19th volume of Gujarati Vishwakosh, beside him is Shrenik Kasturbhai Lalbhai; 22 January 2005

After his research stint at BHU, he went to a number of places to teach mathematics, including science institutions in Surat, Rajkot and Mumbai. During a small period of 1947 – 48, he went to Tata Institute of Fundamental Research as a research associate. There he became associated with Homi Bhabha, father of India's nuclear program. Due to accommodation constraints, he left Mumbai, and continued the rest of his academic career in Gujarat. From 1948 to 1971, he taught at various colleges including: V. P. College, Vallabh Vidyanagar; Gujarat College, Ahmedabad; M.N. College, Visnagar; and University School of Sciences, Gujarat University.

Vaidya was a recipient for the Bombay University's Springer Research Scholarship. Vaidya's initial research under this scholarship resulted in a paper that he sent to Robert Oppenheimer, who appreciated the paper and sent it to the American Physical Society journal Physical Review. The journal published the paper in 1951.

In 1971, he was appointed Chairman of Gujarat Public Service Commission. This was followed by Union Public Service Commission membership during 1977 – 78, during which he served Central Government. His final professional benchmark was the Vice-Chancellorship of Gujarat University during 1978 – 80.

=== International contributions ===
During 1964 to 1973, Vaidya served as visiting professor at number of international universities, including:

- Visiting professor of mathematics at Washington State University, Pullman, Washington, US.
- Visiting professor of mathematics at London University (Queen Elizabeth College), York University and Newcastle University in UK.
- Visiting Scientist at Dublin Institute for Advanced Studies, Dublin, Ireland.
- Visiting Scientist at International Centre for Theoretical Physics at Trieste, Italy.

In June 1971, he delivered a very informative course of lectures at the Institut Henri Poincare, Paris in June 1971. In July 1971, he attended the 6th International Conference on General Relativity and Gravitation at Copenhagen.

== Death ==
For the last several years, Vaidya had confined himself to his Shardanagar house in Ahmedabad due to deteriorating health. He was diagnosed with a kidney ailment in January 2010. He died on 12 March 2010 at Ahmedabad.

He had four daughters, Kumud, Smita, Darshana and Hina.

== Work ==
Albert Einstein's theory of gravity is described by a set of equations which use the mathematics of Riemannian geometry. Professor Vaidya took up on this mission, and accomplished pioneering work which led to conception of such a solution. The result was the Vaidya Metric.

Professor Vaidya's research on general theory of relativity was started when he went to Banaras Hindu University in 1942, where he joined the school of relativity started by Professor V. V. Narlikar. It was only ten months that he spent at BHU at that time, during which the revolutionary idea of developing a spacetime geometry was born within him, which would describe the gravitational potentials in the exterior of a radiating star.

There was pioneering work done around the same area, but it was helpful up to some extent. The well-known Schwarzschild Solution describes the geometry around a spherical star. However, it necessarily assumes the exterior of the star to be empty. Vaidya generalised this case to incorporate the radiation from the star, and the resulting solution was the famous Vaidya metric. Vaidya is known to be one of the pioneers of the Golden age of general relativity.

His discovery of the Vaidya Metric gave him a worldwide reputation at the age of 24, even before the beginning of his professional career.

=== The Vaidya Metric ===
Vaidya Metric applies to a set Einstein's equations that describes the gravitational field of a star which has a sizeable radiation. It pioneered the key idea of using the light rays as a co-ordinate frame. In other words, it was an idea of a null co-ordinate, which eventually played extremely significant role in subsequent research in gravitation theory during forthcoming decades. The Vaidya metric has by now found many applications in gravitation theory. It is widely used and internationally cited to study many problems in gravitation and general relativity.

=== Contributions to scientific community ===
In February 1969, in an occasion to felicitate Professor V. V. Narlikar on his 60th birthday, Professor Vaidya made a proposition to found a society of Indian relativists. The result was the Indian Association for General Relativity and Gravitation (IAGRG), and Professor V. V. Narlikar assumed the position of founder President.

At his suggestion, Vikram Sarabhai laid foundation of mathematics laboratory in Ahmedabad, a pioneering institute of its kind in India. It is known today as the Community Science Center.

Professor Vaidya also established the Gujarat Mathematical Society.

=== Professional affiliations ===
- Founder member of the Indian Association for General Relativity and Gravitation (IAGRG).
- Fellow of the Indian Academy of Sciences (F.A.Sc.).
- Fellow of the Indian National Science Academy (F.N.A).
- President of Calcutta Mathematical Society for 2 years.
- Honorary Fellow of Inter-University Centre for Astronomy and Astrophysics (IUCAA), Pune.
- President of the Indian Mathematical Society – 1976 and 1977.
- A Founder Member of an International Journal "General Relativity and Gravitation", which is published from Berne, Switzerland.
- Member of Indian National Committee on Astronomy- 1976 to 1979.
- President of the UGC Committee on Relativity and Cosmology.
- Participated in activities that led to revision of state-level syllabi of Mathematics textbooks.
- Founded Gujarat Ganit Mandal in 1964 in Bhavnagar. He presided over it in 1964 and 1988. Since inception, it organises programs in rural areas periodically to spread mathematics across all layers of society.

=== Literary work ===
Professor Vaidya's profound scientific contributions had phenomenal impact in journals and publications. During his life, he authored or co-authored more than thirty research papers in General Relativity and Gravitation. They are cited quite frequently in the field research since their publication.

In his efforts to popularise mathematics among Indian students, Professor Vaidya started 'Suganitam' mathematics magazine in 1960s. Since its inception, it has been continually read in numerous schools and colleges, and has inspired generations of mathematics teachers and students alike.

He authored several popular science books in Gujarati:

- Akhil Brahamandman ("In the entire Universe")
- Dashansh Paddhati Sha Mate? ("Why Decimal System?")
- Dadaji Ni Vato ("Grandpa's Tales") – a collection of science stories for children
- What is Modern Mathematics?
- Ganit Darshan ("Discourses in Mathematics"). This book won the 1970–71 prize for Gujarati Scientific Literature from the Gujarat State Government.

Besides, Vaidya published several memoirs from his days as a teacher, such as 'Chalk ane Duster' (Chalk and Duster), and 'America ane apne' (America and Us), which are from his days as a visiting professor at the Washington State University.

He also wrote mathematical and scientific articles in the leading Gujarati cultural magazine, Kumar, founded by Kalaguru Ravishankar Raval, the leading painter, art teacher, art critic, journalist and essayist from Gujarat.

=== Thought ===
Professor Vaidya was known among his colleagues and friends as staunch follower of Gandhian principles – simplicity and honesty. Even in his old age, he used to ride a bicycle. He strongly believed that for a mathematician, his brain was the best tool in itself, and research had very less dependency over resources or money. His lectures, always delivered using a chalk and black board, never failed to captivate the student. His memoirs of his teaching and research are titled 'Chalk and Duster' – his tools of learning and teaching mathematics. Rather than being limited to opinions, he was quite pragmatic in living out his principles.

Honesty in public and personal life was his another remarkable trait. According to his close aides, even during peak years of his scientific career, he exercised extreme prudence and wisdom in using his influence for personal gains of his family, or people related to him.

Spending his senior years in Gujarat University, he initiated statewide efforts to revolutionise mathematics and science education – his motivation being "I am the highest paid mathematics teacher in Gujarat. It cannot be (limited) for teaching MSc classes."

As a visionary educationist, he felt a top-down need to change the way mathematics training was imparted to students, and began programs to educate mathematics teachers on "How to teach mathematics." He frequently interacted with primary students, and tried to awaken their curiosity in mathematics. His foundation of Gujarat Mathematical Society in Bhavnagar, 1964 was aimed at this objective. He tried to reach to farthest rural areas, and aimed the society's efforts to empower teachers and eradicate fear of the subject from students' minds.
