= William Morris Kinnersley =

American physicist

William Morris Kinnersley (January 3, 1944 – February 19, 2025) was an American physicist who is well known for his contributions to general relativity.

Kinnersley earned his Ph.D. from Caltech in 1968, under the direction of Jon Mathews. In 1969, he published an exact null dust solution to the Einstein field equation and thereby created the photon rocket, an object with mass propelled by the emission of light (radiation without mass). This solution remains one of the few known exact solutions with clear physical interpretations, and in consequence it is widely cited as an important breakthrough. In 1978, Kinnersley, C. Hoenselaers, and Basilis C. Xanthopoulos published an important solution generating method for solving the Einstein field equation.
