= Near-horizon metric =

Near-horizon limit of the global metric of a black hole

The near-horizon metric (NHM) refers to the near-horizon limit of the global metric of a black hole. NHMs play an important role in studying the geometry and topology of black holes, but are only well defined for extremal black holes. NHMs are expressed in Gaussian null coordinates, and one important property is that the dependence on the coordinate $r$ is fixed in the near-horizon limit.

== NHM of extremal Reissner–Nordström black holes ==
The metric of extremal Reissner–Nordström black hole is

$$ds^2\,=\,-\Big(1-\frac{M}{r}\Big)^2\,dt^2+\Big(1-\frac{M}{r}\Big)^{-2}dr^2+r^2\,\big(d\theta^2+\sin^2\theta\,d\phi^2 \big)\,.$$

Taking the near-horizon limit

$$t\mapsto \frac{\tilde{t}}{\epsilon}\,,\quad r\mapsto M+\epsilon\,\tilde{r}\,,\quad \epsilon\to 0\,,$$

and then omitting the tildes, one obtains the near-horizon metric

$$ds^2=-\frac{r^2}{M^2}\,dt^2+\frac{M^2}{r^2}\,dr^2+M^2\,\big(d\theta^2+\sin^2\theta\,d\phi^2 \big)$$

== NHM of extremal Kerr black holes ==
The metric of extremal Kerr black hole ($M=a=J/M$) in Boyer–Lindquist coordinates can be written in the following two enlightening forms,

$$ds^2\,=\,-\frac{\rho_K^2\Delta_K}{\Sigma^2}\,dt^2+\frac{\rho_K^2}{\Delta_K}\,dr^2+\rho_K^2d\theta^2+\frac{\Sigma^2\sin^2\theta}{\rho_K^2}\big( d\phi-\omega_K\, dt \big)^2\,,$$

$$ds^2\,=\,-\frac{\Delta_K}{\rho_K^2}\,\big(dt-M\sin^2\theta d\phi \big)^2+\frac{\rho_K^2}{\Delta_K}\,dr^2+\rho_K^2 d\theta^2+\frac{\sin^2\theta}{\rho_K^2}\Big( Mdt-(r^2+M^2)d\phi \Big)^2\,,$$

where

$$\rho_K^2:=r^2+M^2\cos^2\theta\,,\;\;  \Delta_K:=\big(r-M\big)^2\,,\;\;  \Sigma^2:=\big(r^2+M^2\big)^2-M^2\Delta_K\sin^2\theta\,,\;\;  \omega_K:=\frac{2M^2 r}{\Sigma^2}\,.$$

Taking the near-horizon limit

$$t\mapsto \frac{\tilde{t}}{\epsilon}\,,\quad r\mapsto M+\epsilon\,\tilde{r}\,,\quad \phi\mapsto \tilde{\phi}+\frac{1}{2M\epsilon}\tilde{t}\,,\quad \epsilon\to 0\,,$$

and omitting the tildes, one obtains the near-horizon metric (this is also called extremal Kerr throat )

$$ds^2\simeq \frac{1+\cos^2\theta}{2}\,\Big(-\frac{r^2}{2M^2}\,dt^2+\frac{2M^2}{r^2}\,dr^2+2M^2d\theta^2 \Big)+\frac{4M^2\sin^2\theta}{1+\cos^2\theta}\,\Big(d\phi +\frac{rdt}{2M^2}\Big)^2\,.$$

== NHM of extremal Kerr–Newman black holes ==
Extremal Kerr–Newman black holes ($r_+^2=M^2+Q^2$) are described by the metric

$$ds^2=-\Big(1-\frac{2Mr-Q^2}{\rho_{KN}} \!\Big)dt^2-\frac{2a\sin^2\!\theta\,(2Mr-Q^2)}{\rho_{KN}}dt d\phi
+\rho_{KN}\Big(\frac{dr^2}{\Delta_{KN}} + d\theta^2\Big)+\frac{ \Sigma^2 }{\rho_{KN}}d\phi^2,$$

where

$$\Delta_{KN}\,:=\, r^2-2Mr+a^2+Q^2\,,\;\; \rho_{KN}\,:=\,r^2+a^2\cos^2\!\theta\,,\;\;\Sigma^2\,:=\,(r^2+a^2)^2-\Delta_{KN} a^2\sin^2\theta\,.$$

Taking the near-horizon transformation

$$t\mapsto \frac{\tilde{t}}{\epsilon}\,,\quad r\mapsto M+\epsilon\,\tilde{r}\,,\quad \phi\mapsto \tilde{\phi}+\frac{a}{r^2_0\epsilon}\tilde{t}\,,\quad \epsilon\to 0\,,\quad \Big(r^2_0\,:=\,M^2+a^2\Big)$$

and omitting the tildes, one obtains the NHM

$$ds^2\simeq \Big(1-\frac{a^2}{r_0^2}\sin^2\!\theta \Big)\left(-\frac{r^2}{r^2_0}dt^2+\frac{r^2_0}{r^2}dr^2+r^2_0d\theta^2 \right)+r^2_0\sin^2\!\theta\,\Big(1-\frac{a^2}{r_0^2} \sin^2\!\theta\Big)^{-1}\left( d\phi+\frac{2arM}{r^4_0}dt \right)^{2}\,.$$

== NHMs of generic black holes ==
In addition to the NHMs of extremal Kerr–Newman family metrics discussed above, all stationary NHMs could be written in the form

$ds^2=(\hat{h}_{AB}G^A G^B-F)r^2 dv^2+2dvdr- \hat{h}_{AB}G^B r dv dy^A -\hat{h}_{AB}G^Ar dv dy^B+\hat{h}_{AB} dy^A dy^B$
$=-F\,r^2 dv^2+2dvdr+\hat{h}_{AB}\big(dy^A-G^A\,r dv \big)\big(dy^B-G^B\,r dv \big)\,,$

where the metric functions $\{F,G^A\}$ are independent of the coordinate r, $\hat{h}_{AB}$ denotes the intrinsic metric of the horizon, and $y^A$ are isothermal coordinates on the horizon.

Remark: In Gaussian null coordinates, the black hole horizon corresponds to $r=0$.

== See also ==
- Extremal black hole
- Reissner–Nordström metric
- Kerr metric
- Kerr–Newman metric
