= Weyl scalar =

Set of five scalars

In the Newman–Penrose (NP) formalism of general relativity, Weyl scalars refer to a set of five complex scalars $\{\Psi_0, \Psi_1, \Psi_2,\Psi_3, \Psi_4\}$ which encode the ten independent components of the Weyl tensor of a four-dimensional spacetime.

== Definitions ==
Given a complex null tetrad $\{l^a, n^a, m^a, \bar{m}^a\}$ and with the convention $\{(-,+,+,+); l^a n_a=-1\,,m^a \bar{m}_a=1\}$, the Weyl-NP scalars are defined by

$$\Psi_0 :=  C_{\alpha\beta\gamma\delta} l^\alpha m^\beta l^\gamma m^\delta\ ,$$

$$\Psi_1 := C_{\alpha\beta\gamma\delta} l^\alpha n^\beta l^\gamma m^\delta\ ,$$

$$\Psi_2 := C_{\alpha\beta\gamma\delta} l^\alpha m^\beta \bar{m}^\gamma n^\delta\ ,$$

$$\Psi_3 := C_{\alpha\beta\gamma\delta} l^\alpha n^\beta \bar{m}^\gamma n^\delta\ ,$$

$$\Psi_4 := C_{\alpha\beta\gamma\delta} n^\alpha \bar{m}^\beta n^\gamma \bar{m}^\delta\ .$$

Note: If one adopts the convention $\{(+,-,-,-); l^a n_a=1\,,m^a \bar{m}_a=-1\}$, the definitions of $\Psi_i$ should take the opposite values; that is to say, $\Psi_i\mapsto-\Psi_i$ after the signature transition.

== Alternative derivations ==
According to the definitions above, one should find out the Weyl tensors before calculating the Weyl-NP scalars via contractions with relevant tetrad vectors. This method, however, does not fully reflect the spirit of Newman–Penrose formalism. As an alternative, one could firstly compute the spin coefficients and then use the NP field equations to derive the five Weyl-NP scalars

$$\Psi_0=D\sigma-\delta\kappa-(\rho+\bar{\rho})\sigma-(3\varepsilon-\bar{\varepsilon})\sigma+(\tau-\bar{\pi}+\bar{\alpha}+3\beta)\kappa\,,$$
$$\Psi_1=D\beta-\delta\varepsilon-(\alpha+\pi)\sigma-(\bar{\rho}-\bar{\varepsilon})\beta+(\mu+\gamma)\kappa+(\bar{\alpha}-\bar{\pi})\varepsilon\,,$$
$$\Psi_2=\bar{\delta}\tau-\Delta\rho-(\rho\bar{\mu}+\sigma\lambda)+(\bar{\beta}-\alpha-\bar{\tau})\tau+(\gamma+\bar{\gamma})\rho+\nu\kappa-2\Lambda\,,$$
$$\Psi_3=\bar{\delta}\gamma-\Delta\alpha+(\rho+\varepsilon)\nu-(\tau+\beta)\lambda+(\bar{\gamma}-\bar{\mu})\alpha+(\bar{\beta}-\bar{\tau})\gamma\,.$$
$$\Psi_4=\delta\nu-\Delta\lambda-(\mu+\bar{\mu})\lambda-(3\gamma-\bar{\gamma})\lambda+(3\alpha+\bar{\beta}+\pi-\bar{\tau})\nu\,.$$

where $\Lambda$ (used for $\Psi_2$) refers to the NP curvature scalar $\Lambda:=\frac{R}{24}$ which could be calculated directly from the spacetime metric $g_{ab}$.

== Physical interpretation ==
Szekeres (1965) gave an interpretation of the different Weyl scalars at large distances:

$\Psi_2$ is a "Coulomb" term, representing the gravitational monopole of the source;
$\Psi_1$ & $\Psi_3$ are ingoing and outgoing "longitudinal" radiation terms;
$\Psi_0$ & $\Psi_4$ are ingoing and outgoing "transverse" radiation terms.

For a general asymptotically flat spacetime containing radiation (Petrov Type I), $\Psi_1$ & $\Psi_3$ can be transformed to zero by an appropriate choice of null tetrad. Thus these can be viewed as gauge quantities.

A particularly important case is the Weyl scalar $\Psi_4$. It can be shown to describe outgoing gravitational radiation (in an asymptotically flat spacetime) as

$$\Psi_4 = \frac{1}{2}\left( \ddot{h}_{\hat{\theta} \hat{\theta}} - \ddot{h}_{\hat{\phi} \hat{\phi}} \right) + i \ddot{h}_{\hat{\theta}\hat{\phi}} = -\ddot{h}_+ + i \ddot{h}_\times\ .$$

Here, $h_+$ and $h_\times$ are the "plus" and "cross" polarizations of gravitational radiation, and the double dots represent double time-differentiation.

There are, however, certain examples in which the interpretation listed above fails. These are exact vacuum solutions of the Einstein field equations with cylindrical symmetry. For instance, a static (infinitely long) cylinder can produce a gravitational field which has not only the expected "Coulomb"-like Weyl component $\Psi_2$, but also non-vanishing "transverse wave"-components $\Psi_0$ and $\Psi_4$. Furthermore, purely outgoing Einstein-Rosen waves have a non-zero "incoming transverse wave"-component $\Psi_0$.

== See also ==
- Weyl-NP and Ricci-NP scalars
