= Daily Observer =

Daily Observer may refer to:

- The Daily Observer (Antigua), the only daily newspaper of Antigua and Barbuda, est. 1993
- Northern Daily Leader, published in Tamworth, New South Wales, Australia, and formerly known as The Daily Observer
- The Daily Observer (Bangladesh), est. 2011
- The Daily Observer, published in The Gambia
- Liberian Observer, which has also used the name Daily Observer
- Chicago Daily Observer, a conservative Internet publication founded by Tom Roeser

== See also ==
- Observer (disambiguation)
- The Observer (disambiguation)
- National Observer (disambiguation)
