= The Observer (disambiguation) =

The Observer is a British newspaper published on Sundays.

The Observer may also refer to:

== Periodicals ==
=== Australia ===
- Melbourne Observer, a weekly newspaper in Melbourne, first published in 1969 as the Sunday Observer
- The Observer (Gladstone), a daily newspaper in Queensland
- The Observer, a fortnightly magazine founded in 1958 and absorbed by The Bulletin in 1961
- The Observer (Adelaide), a weekly paper established in 1843
- The Northern Daily Leader, Tamworth, New South Wales, a daily newspaper est. 1876; previously known as The Tamworth Observer and Northern Advertiser, The Tamworth Daily Observer, and The Daily Observer

=== United Kingdom ===
- Bristol Observer, a weekly local newspaper
- Harrow Observer, a weekly local newspaper
- Stratford Observer, a weekly local newspaper
- Watford Observer, a weekly local newspaper

=== United States ===
- The Observer (Kearny, New Jersey), a weekly newspaper
- The New York Observer, a Manhattan newspaper now online-only and called Observer
- The Dallas Observer, an alternative weekly
- The Observer, student newspaper at Bristol Community College, Massachusetts
- The Charlotte Observer, in North Carolina
- The News & Observer, in North Carolina
- The Moultrie Observer, in Georgia
- The Observer, student newspaper of Case Western Reserve University
- The Fordham Observer, one of two official student newspapers at Fordham University
- The Observer (Notre Dame), joint student newspaper of University of Notre Dame, Holy Cross College, and Saint Mary's College, Notre Dame, Indiana
- The Fayetteville Observer, in North Carolina
- The Weekly Observer, in Hemingway, South Carolina
- The Observer (La Grande), a daily newspaper in Oregon
- The Portland Observer, an Oregon weekly newspaper
- The Observer (Dunkirk), a newspaper in New York
- The Observer, official student newspaper of Yeshiva University's Stern College for Women
- The Ann Arbor Observer, monthly magazine in Michigan
- The Texas Observer, a political magazine
- The Observer, Central Washington University's student-run newspaper

=== Other ===
- The Daily Observer (Antigua), est. 1993, the only daily newspaper of Antigua and Barbuda
- The Daily Observer (Bangladesh), est. 2011
  - The Bangladesh Observer (1949–2010)
- United Church Observer, a Canadian Christian magazine est. 1938 (retitled Broadview in 2019)
- The Daily Observer, in Gambia
- The Jamaica Observer, a daily newspaper published in Kingston
- The Liberian Observer, est. 1981
- The Pakistan Observer, est. 2008
- Sunday Observer (Sri Lanka)
- The St. Kitts-Nevis Observer
- The Observer (Uganda)
- The Wrestling Observer Newsletter, a trade publication

== Fiction ==
- The Observer, 1785 book by Richard Cumberland
- The Observer, a character in the TV series Fringe
- The Observer, a play by Matt Charman which debuted in 2009
- The Birdwatcher aka The Observer, a 1988 Estonian film by Arvo Iho

== See also ==
- Observer (disambiguation)
- Daily Observer (disambiguation)
- National Observer (disambiguation)
