= Observation (disambiguation) =

Observation is the use of senses to obtain knowledge.

Observation may also refer to:

- Observer (special relativity) a specialized meaning of the concept that physicists use
- Observation car (often abbreviated to observation), a type of railroad passenger car
- Watchful waiting (also referred to as observation), an approach to a medical problem in which time is allowed to pass before further testing or therapy is pursued
- Medical observation
- Observations and Measurements, an information model and data transfer standard
- An empirically obtained random variate in statistics
- A realization of a random variable (a unit of a sample), in statistics
- Observation, obtaining audit evidence by watching someone at work

== As a proper name ==
- "The Observation", a song by Donovan from his 1967 album Mellow Yellow
- "Observations", a song by Avail from their 1992 album Satiate
- Observations (album), a 1996 album by Steve Swell and Chris Kelsey
- Observations (Avedon book), Richard Avedon's 1959 collaborative book with Truman Capote containing portraits of famous people
- Observation (video game), a 2019 video game developed by No Code and published by Devolver Digital
- Observation (steamboat), a vessel that exploded and sank in New York City in 1932
- Observations (Belon book), a 16th-century ethnographical book

== See also ==
- Observer (disambiguation)
- Observation balloon
- Observation post
- Surveillance
