= Spacetime =

Mathematical model combining space and time

In physics, spacetime, or the space-time continuum, is a mathematical model that fuses the three dimensions of space and the one dimension of time into a single four-dimensional continuum. Spacetime diagrams are useful in visualizing and understanding relativistic effects, such as how different observers perceive where and when events occur.

Until the turn of the 20th century, the assumption had been that the three-dimensional geometry of the universe (its description in terms of locations, shapes, distances, and directions) was distinct from time (the measurement of when events occur within the universe). However, space and time took on new meanings with the Lorentz transformation and special theory of relativity.

In 1908, Hermann Minkowski presented a geometric interpretation of special relativity that fused time and the three spatial dimensions into a single four-dimensional continuum now known as Minkowski space. This interpretation proved vital to the general theory of relativity, wherein spacetime is curved by mass and energy.

== Fundamentals ==
=== Definitions ===
Non-relativistic classical mechanics treats time as a universal quantity of measurement that is uniform throughout, is separate from space, and is agreed on by all observers. Classical mechanics assumes that time has a constant rate of passage, independent of the observer's state of motion, or anything external. It assumes that space is Euclidean: it assumes that space follows the geometry of common sense.

In the context of special relativity, time cannot be separated from the three dimensions of space, because the observed rate at which time passes for an object depends on the object's velocity relative to the observer. General relativity provides an explanation of how gravitational fields can slow the passage of time for an object as seen by an observer outside the field.

Time is a dimension of spacetime whose sign in the metric is opposite to space's. That means that separation along it counts against the interval (the spacetime equivalent to distance) instead of adding to it. Which direction counts as time depends on your frame of reference, but it's always a direction inside the light cone.

In ordinary space, a position is specified by three numbers, known as dimensions. In the Cartesian coordinate system, these are often called x, y and z. A point in spacetime is called an event, and requires four numbers to be specified: the three-dimensional location in space, plus the position in time (Fig. 1). An event is represented by a set of coordinates x, y, z and t. Spacetime is thus four-dimensional.

Unlike the analogies used in popular writings to explain events, such as firecrackers or sparks, mathematical events have zero duration and represent a single point in spacetime. Although it is possible to be in motion relative to the popping of a firecracker or a spark, it is not possible for an observer to be in motion relative to an event.

The path of a particle through spacetime can be considered to be a sequence of events. The series of events can be linked together to form a curve that represents the particle's progress through spacetime. That path is called the particle's world line.

Mathematically, spacetime is a manifold, which is to say, it appears locally "flat" near each point in the same way that, at small enough scales, the surface of a globe appears to be flat. A scale factor, $c$ (conventionally called the speed-of-light) relates distances measured in space to distances measured in time. The magnitude of this scale factor (nearly 300,000 kilometres or 190,000 miles in space being equivalent to one second in time), along with the fact that spacetime is a manifold, implies that at ordinary, non-relativistic speeds and at ordinary, human-scale distances, there is little that humans might observe that is noticeably different from what they might observe if the world were Euclidean. It was only with the advent of sensitive scientific measurements in the mid-1800s, such as the Fizeau experiment and the Michelson–Morley experiment, that puzzling discrepancies began to be noted between observation versus predictions based on the implicit assumption of Euclidean space.

Figure 1-1. Each location in spacetime is marked by four numbers defined by a frame of reference: the position in space, and the time, which can be visualized as the reading of a clock located at each position in space. The 'observer' synchronizes the clocks according to their own reference frame.

In special relativity, an observer will, in most cases, mean a frame of reference from which a set of objects or events is being measured. This usage differs significantly from the ordinary English meaning of the term. Reference frames are inherently nonlocal constructs, and according to this usage of the term, it does not make sense to speak of an observer as having a location.

In Fig. 1-1, imagine that the frame under consideration is equipped with a dense lattice of clocks, synchronized within this reference frame, that extends indefinitely throughout the three dimensions of space. Any specific location within the lattice is not important. The latticework of clocks is used to determine the time and position of events taking place within the whole frame. The term observer refers to the whole ensemble of clocks associated with one inertial frame of reference.

In this idealized case, every point in space has a clock associated with it, and thus the clocks register each event instantly, with no time delay between an event and its recording. A real observer will see a delay between the emission of a signal and its detection due to the speed of light. To synchronize the clocks, in the data reduction following an experiment, the time when a signal is received will be corrected to reflect its actual time were it to have been recorded by an idealized lattice of clocks.

In many books on special relativity, especially older ones, the word "observer" is used in the more ordinary sense of the word. It is usually clear from context which meaning has been adopted.

Physicists distinguish between what one measures or observes, after one has factored out signal propagation delays, versus what one visually sees without such corrections. Failing to understand the difference between what one measures and what one sees is the source of much confusion among students of relativity.

== History ==
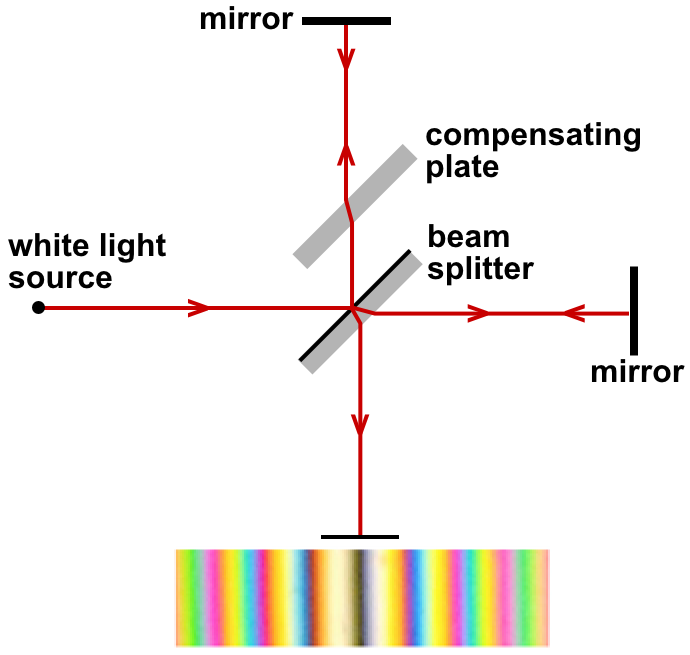

Figure 1-2. Michelson and Morley expected that motion through the aether would cause a differential phase shift between light traversing the two arms of their apparatus. The most logical explanation of their negative result, aether dragging, was in conflict with the observation of stellar aberration.

By the mid-1800s, various experiments such as the observation of the Arago spot and differential measurements of the speed of light in air versus water were considered to have proven the wave nature of light as opposed to a corpuscular theory. Propagation of waves was then assumed to require the existence of a waving medium; in the case of light waves, this was considered to be a hypothetical luminiferous aether. (Note: luminiferous from the Latin lumen, light, + ferens, carrying; aether from the Greek αἰθήρ (aithēr), pure air, clear sky) The various attempts to establish the properties of this hypothetical medium yielded contradictory results. For example, the Fizeau experiment of 1851, conducted by French physicist Hippolyte Fizeau, demonstrated that the speed of light in flowing water was less than the sum of the speed of light in air plus the speed of the water by an amount dependent on the water's index of refraction.

Among other issues, the dependence of the partial aether-dragging implied by this experiment on the index of refraction (which is dependent on wavelength) led to the unpalatable conclusion that aether simultaneously flows at different speeds for different colors of light. The Michelson–Morley experiment of 1887 (Fig. 1-2) showed no differential influence of Earth's motions through the hypothetical aether on the speed of light, and the most likely explanation, complete aether dragging, was in conflict with the observation of stellar aberration.

George Francis FitzGerald in 1889, and Hendrik Lorentz in 1892, independently proposed that material bodies traveling through the fixed aether were physically affected by their passage, contracting in the direction of motion by an amount that was exactly what was necessary to explain the negative results of the Michelson–Morley experiment. No length changes occur in directions transverse to the direction of motion.

By 1904, Lorentz had expanded his theory such that he had arrived at equations formally identical with those that Einstein was to derive later, i.e. the Lorentz transformation. As a theory of dynamics (the study of forces and torques and their effect on motion), his theory assumed actual physical deformations of the physical constituents of matter. Lorentz's equations predicted a quantity that he called local time, with which he could explain the aberration of light, the Fizeau experiment and other phenomena.

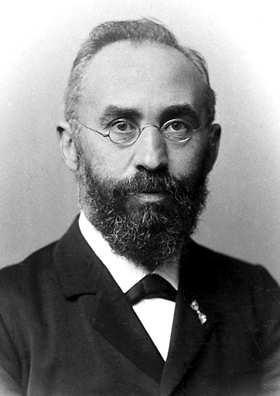
Hendrik Lorentz

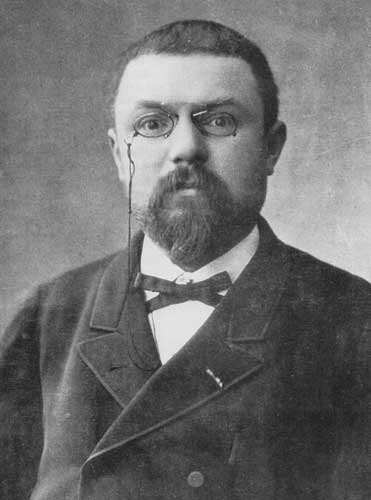
Henri Poincaré

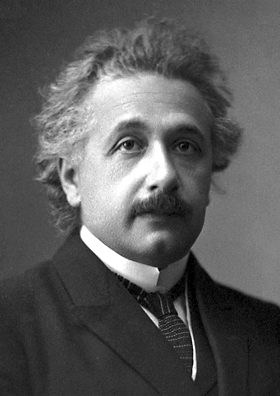
Albert Einstein

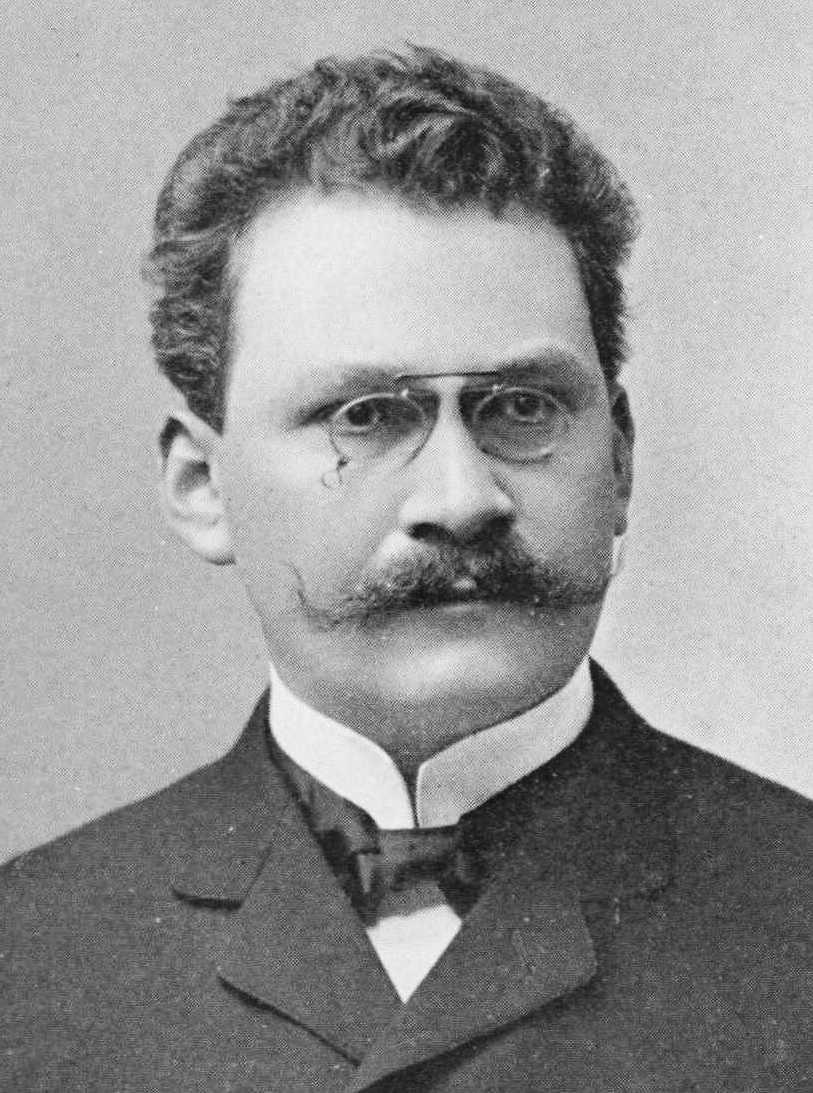
Hermann Minkowski

Figure 1-3

Henri Poincaré was the first to combine space and time into spacetime. He argued in 1898 that the simultaneity of two events is a matter of convention. (Note: By stating that simultaneity is a matter of convention, Poincaré meant that to talk about time at all, one must have synchronized clocks, and the synchronization of clocks must be established by a specified, operational procedure (convention). This stance represented a fundamental philosophical break from Newton, who conceived of an absolute, true time that was independent of the workings of the inaccurate clocks of his day. This stance also represented a direct attack against the influential philosopher Henri Bergson, who argued that time, simultaneity, and duration were matters of intuitive understanding.) In 1900, he recognized that Lorentz's "local time" is actually what is indicated by moving clocks by applying an explicitly operational definition of clock synchronization assuming constant light speed. (Note: The operational procedure adopted by Poincaré was essentially identical to what is known as Einstein synchronization, even though a variant of it was already a widely used procedure by telegraphers in the middle 19th century. Basically, to synchronize two clocks, one flashes a light signal from one to the other, and adjusts for the time that the flash takes to arrive.) In 1900 and 1904, he suggested the inherent undetectability of the aether by emphasizing the validity of what he called the principle of relativity. In 1905/1906 he mathematically perfected Lorentz's theory of electrons in order to bring it into accordance with the postulate of relativity.

While discussing various hypotheses on Lorentz invariant gravitation, he introduced the innovative concept of a 4-dimensional spacetime by defining various four-vectors, namely four-position, four-velocity, and four-force. He did not pursue the 4-dimensional formalism in subsequent papers, however, stating that this line of research seemed to "entail great pain for limited profit", ultimately concluding "that three-dimensional language seems the best suited to the description of our world". Even as late as 1909, Poincaré continued to describe the dynamical interpretation of the Lorentz transform.

In 1905, Albert Einstein analyzed special relativity in terms of kinematics (the study of moving bodies without reference to forces) rather than dynamics. His results were mathematically equivalent to those of Lorentz and Poincaré. He obtained them by recognizing that the entire theory can be built upon two postulates: the principle of relativity and the principle of the constancy of light speed. His work was filled with vivid imagery involving the exchange of light signals between clocks in motion, careful measurements of the lengths of moving rods, and other such examples. (Note: A hallmark of Einstein's career, in fact, was his use of visualized thought experiments (Gedanken–Experimente) as a fundamental tool for understanding physical issues. For special relativity, he employed moving trains and flashes of lightning for his most penetrating insights. For curved spacetime, he considered a painter falling off a roof, accelerating elevators, blind beetles crawling on curved surfaces and the like. In his great Solvay Debates with Bohr on the nature of reality (1927 and 1930), he devised multiple imaginary contraptions intended to show, at least in concept, means whereby the Heisenberg uncertainty principle might be evaded. Finally, in a profound contribution to the literature on quantum mechanics, Einstein considered two particles briefly interacting and then flying apart so that their states are correlated, anticipating the phenomenon known as quantum entanglement.)

Einstein in 1905 superseded previous attempts of an electromagnetic mass–energy relation by introducing the general equivalence of mass and energy, which was instrumental for his subsequent formulation of the equivalence principle in 1907, which declares the equivalence of inertial and gravitational mass. By using the mass–energy equivalence, Einstein showed that the gravitational mass of a body is proportional to its energy content, which was one of the early results in developing general relativity. While it would appear that he did not at first think geometrically about spacetime, in the further development of general relativity, Einstein fully incorporated the spacetime formalism.

When Einstein published in 1905, another of his competitors, his former mathematics professor Hermann Minkowski, had also arrived at most of the basic elements of special relativity. Max Born recounted a meeting he had made with Minkowski, seeking to be Minkowski's student/collaborator:

I went to Cologne, met Minkowski and heard his celebrated lecture 'Space and Time' delivered on 2 September 1908. [...] He told me later that it came to him as a great shock when Einstein published his paper in which the equivalence of the different local times of observers moving relative to each other was pronounced; for he had reached the same conclusions independently but did not publish them because he wished first to work out the mathematical structure in all its splendor. He never made a priority claim and always gave Einstein his full share in the great discovery.

Minkowski had been concerned with the state of electrodynamics after Michelson's disruptive experiments at least since the summer of 1905, when Minkowski and David Hilbert led an advanced seminar attended by notable physicists of the time to study the papers of Lorentz, Poincaré et al. Minkowski saw Einstein's work as an extension of Lorentz's, and was most directly influenced by Poincaré.

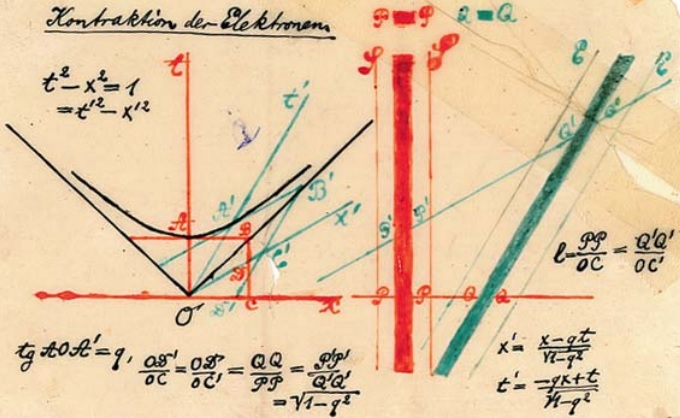
Figure 1–4. Hand-colored transparency presented by Minkowski in his 1908 Raum und Zeit lecture

On 5 November 1907 (a little more than a year before his death), Minkowski introduced his geometric interpretation of spacetime in a lecture to the Göttingen Mathematical society with the title, The Relativity Principle (Das Relativitätsprinzip). (Note: In the original version of this lecture, Minkowski continued to use such obsolescent terms as the ether, but the posthumous publication in 1915 of this lecture in the Annals of Physics (Annalen der Physik) was edited by Sommerfeld to remove this term. Sommerfeld also edited the published form of this lecture to revise Minkowski's judgement of Einstein from being a mere clarifier of the principle of relativity, to being its chief expositor.) On 21 September 1908, Minkowski presented his talk, Space and Time (Raum und Zeit), to the German Society of Scientists and Physicians. The opening words of Space and Time include Minkowski's statement that "Henceforth, space for itself, and time for itself shall completely reduce to a mere shadow, and only some sort of union of the two shall preserve independence." Space and Time included the first public presentation of spacetime diagrams (Fig. 1-4), and included a remarkable demonstration that the concept of the invariant interval (discussed below), along with the empirical observation that the speed of light is finite, allows derivation of the entirety of special relativity. (Note: (In the following, the group G_{∞} is the Galilean group and the group G_{c} the Lorentz group.) "With respect to this it is clear that the group G_{c} in the limit for c = ∞, i.e. as group G_{∞}, exactly becomes the full group belonging to Newtonian Mechanics. In this state of affairs, and since G_{c} is mathematically more intelligible than G_{∞}, a mathematician may, by a free play of imagination, hit upon the thought that natural phenomena actually possess an invariance, not for the group G_{∞}, but rather for a group G_{c}, where c is definitely finite, and only exceedingly large using the ordinary measuring units.")

The spacetime concept and the Lorentz group are closely connected to certain types of sphere, hyperbolic, or conformal geometries and their transformation groups already developed in the 19th century, in which invariant intervals analogous to the spacetime interval are used. (Note: For instance, the Lorentz group is a subgroup of the conformal group in four dimensions. The Lorentz group is isomorphic to the Laguerre group transforming planes into planes, it is isomorphic to the Möbius group of the plane, and is isomorphic to the group of isometries in hyperbolic space which is often expressed in terms of the hyperboloid model.)

Einstein, for his part, was initially dismissive of Minkowski's geometric interpretation of special relativity, regarding it as überflüssige Gelehrsamkeit (superfluous learnedness). However, in order to complete his search for general relativity that started in 1907, the geometric interpretation of relativity proved to be vital. In 1916, Einstein fully acknowledged his indebtedness to Minkowski, whose interpretation greatly facilitated the transition to general relativity. Since there are other types of spacetime, such as the curved spacetime of general relativity, the spacetime of special relativity is today known as Minkowski spacetime.

== Spacetime in special relativity ==
=== Spacetime interval ===
In three dimensions, the distance $\Delta{d}$ between two points can be defined using the Pythagorean theorem:
$$(\Delta{d})^2 = (\Delta{x})^2 + (\Delta{y})^2 + (\Delta{z})^2$$

Although two viewers may measure the x, y, and z position of the two points using different coordinate systems, the distance between the points will be the same for both, assuming that they are measuring using the same units. The distance is "invariant".

In special relativity, however, the distance between two points is no longer the same if measured by two different observers, when one of the observers is moving, because of Lorentz contraction. The situation is even more complicated if the two points are separated in time as well as in space. For example, if one observer sees two events occur at the same place, but at different times, a person moving with respect to the first observer will see the two events occurring at different places, because the moving point of view sees itself as stationary, and the position of the event as receding or approaching. Thus, a different measure must be used to measure the effective "distance" between two events.

In four-dimensional spacetime, the analog to distance is the interval. Although time comes in as a fourth dimension, it is treated differently from the spatial dimensions. Minkowski space hence differs in important respects from four-dimensional Euclidean space. The fundamental reason for merging space and time into spacetime is that space and time are separately not invariant, which is to say that, under the proper conditions, different observers will disagree on the length of time between two events (because of time dilation) or the distance between the two events (because of length contraction). Special relativity provides a new invariant, called the spacetime interval or the Lorentz interval, which combines distances in space and in time. All observers who measure the time and distance between any two events will end up computing the same spacetime interval. Suppose an observer measures two events as being separated in time by $\Delta t$ and a spatial distance $\Delta x.$ Then the squared spacetime interval $(\Delta{s})^2$ between the two events that are separated by a distance $\Delta{x}$ in space and by $\Delta{ct}= c\Delta t$ in the $ct$-coordinate is:
$$(\Delta s)^2 = (\Delta ct)^2 - (\Delta x)^2,$$
or for three space dimensions,
$$(\Delta s)^2 = (\Delta ct)^2 - (\Delta x)^2 - (\Delta y)^2 - (\Delta z)^2.$$

The constant $c,$ the speed of light, converts time $t$ units (like seconds) into space units (like meters). The squared interval $\Delta s^2$ is a measure of separation between events A and B that are time separated and in addition space separated either because there are two separate objects undergoing events, or because a single object in space is moving inertially between its events. The separation interval is the difference between the square of the spatial distance separating event B from event A and the square of the spatial distance traveled by a light signal in that same time interval $\Delta t$. If the event separation is due to a light signal, then this difference vanishes and $\Delta s =0$.

When the event considered is infinitesimally close to each other, then we may write
$$ds^2 = c^2dt^2 - dx^2-dy^2-dz^2.$$

In a different inertial frame, say with coordinates $(t',x',y',z')$, the spacetime interval $ds'$ can be written in a same form as above. Because of the constancy of speed of light, the light events in all inertial frames belong to zero interval, $ds=ds'=0$. For any other infinitesimal event where $ds\neq 0$, one can prove that $ds^2=ds'^2$ which in turn upon integration leads to $s=s'$. The invariance of the spacetime interval between the same events for all inertial frames of reference is one of the fundamental results of special theory of relativity.

Although for brevity, one frequently sees interval expressions expressed without deltas, including in most of the following discussion, it should be understood that in general, $x$ means $\Delta{x}$, etc. We are always concerned with differences of spatial or temporal coordinate values belonging to two events, and since there is no preferred origin, single coordinate values have no essential meaning.

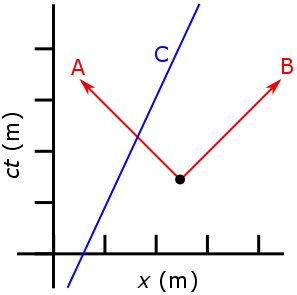
Figure 2–1. Spacetime diagram illustrating two photons, A and B, originating at the same event, and a slower-than-light-speed object, C

The equation above is similar to the Pythagorean theorem, except with a minus sign between the $(ct)^2$ and the $x^2$ terms. The spacetime interval is the quantity $s^2,$ not $s$ itself. The reason is that unlike distances in Euclidean geometry, intervals in Minkowski spacetime can be negative. Rather than deal with square roots of negative numbers, physicists customarily regard $s^2$ as a distinct symbol in itself, rather than the square of something.

Note: There are two sign conventions in use in the relativity literature:

1. $s^2 = (ct)^2 - x^2 - y^2 - z^2$
2. $s^2 = -(ct)^2 + x^2 + y^2 + z^2$

These sign conventions are associated with the metric signatures (+−−−) and (−+++). A minor variation is to place the time coordinate last rather than first. Both conventions are widely used within the field of study.

In the following discussion, we use the first convention.

In general $s^2$ can assume any real number value. If $s^2$ is positive, the spacetime interval is referred to as timelike. Since spatial distance traversed by any massive object is always less than distance traveled by the light for the same time interval, positive intervals are always timelike. If $s^2$ is negative, the spacetime interval is said to be spacelike. Spacetime intervals are equal to zero when $x = \pm ct.$ In other words, the spacetime interval between two events on the world line of something moving at the speed of light is zero. Such an interval is termed lightlike or null. A photon arriving in our eye from a distant star will not have aged, despite having (from our perspective) spent years in its passage.

A spacetime diagram is typically drawn with only a single space and a single time coordinate. Fig. 2-1 presents a spacetime diagram illustrating the world lines (i.e. paths in spacetime) of two photons, A and B, originating from the same event and going in opposite directions. In addition, C illustrates the world line of a slower-than-light-speed object. The vertical time coordinate is scaled by $c$ so that it has the same units (meters) as the horizontal space coordinate. Since photons travel at the speed of light, their world lines have a slope of ±1. In other words, every meter that a photon travels to the left or right requires approximately 3.3 nanoseconds of time.

=== Reference frames ===
Figure 2-2. Galilean diagram of two frames of reference in standard configuration

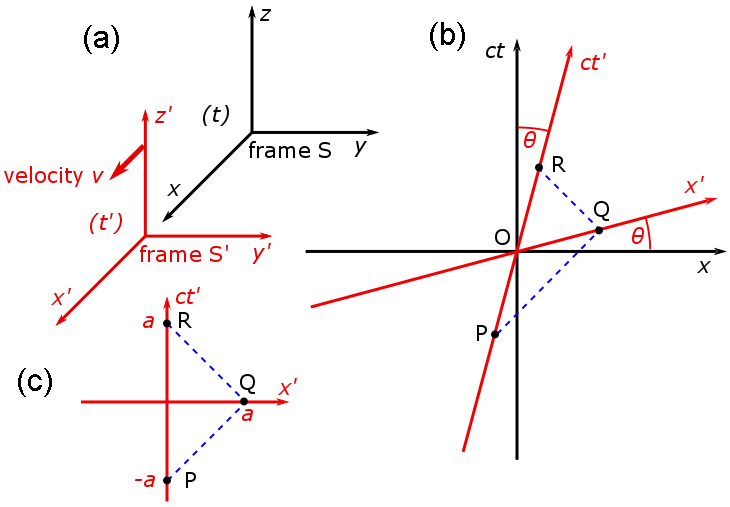
Figure 2–3. (a) Galilean diagram of two frames of reference in standard configuration, (b) spacetime diagram of two frames of reference, (c) spacetime diagram showing the path of a reflected light pulse

To gain insight in how spacetime coordinates measured by observers in different reference frames compare with each other, it is useful to work with a simplified setup with frames in a standard configuration. With care, this allows simplification of the math with no loss of generality in the conclusions that are reached. In Fig. 2-2, two Galilean reference frames (i.e. conventional 3-space frames) are displayed in relative motion. Frame S belongs to a first observer O, and frame S′ (pronounced "S prime") belongs to a second observer O′.

- The x, y, z axes of frame S are oriented parallel to the respective primed axes of frame S′.
- Frame S′ moves in the x-direction of frame S with a constant velocity v as measured in frame S.
- The origins of frames S and S′ are coincident when time t = 0 for frame S and t′ = 0 for frame S′.

Fig. 2-3a redraws Fig. 2-2 in a different orientation. Fig. 2-3b illustrates a relativistic spacetime diagram from the viewpoint of observer O. Since S and S′ are in standard configuration, their origins coincide at times t = 0 in frame S and t′ = 0 in frame S′. The ct′ axis passes through the events in frame S′ which have x′ = 0. But the points with x′ = 0 are moving in the x-direction of frame S with velocity v, so that they are not coincident with the ct axis at any time other than zero. Therefore, the ct′ axis is tilted with respect to the ct axis by an angle θ given by
$$\tan(\theta) = v/c.$$

The x′ axis is also tilted with respect to the x axis. To determine the angle of this tilt, we recall that the slope of the world line of a light pulse is always ±1. Fig. 2-3c presents a spacetime diagram from the viewpoint of observer O′. Event P represents the emission of a light pulse at x′ = 0, ct′ = −a. The pulse is reflected from a mirror situated at distance a from the light source (event Q), and returns to the light source at x′ = 0, ct′ = a (event R).

The same events P, Q, R are plotted in Fig. 2-3b in the frame of observer O. The light paths have slopes = 1 and −1, so that △PQR forms a right triangle with PQ and QR both at 45 degrees to the x and ct axes. Since OP = OQ = OR, the angle between x′ and x must also be θ.

While the rest frame has space and time axes that meet at right angles, the moving frame is drawn with axes that meet at an acute angle. The frames are actually equivalent. The asymmetry is due to unavoidable distortions in how spacetime coordinates can map onto a Cartesian plane, and should be considered no stranger than the manner in which, on a Mercator projection of the Earth, the relative sizes of land masses near the poles (Greenland and Antarctica) are highly exaggerated relative to land masses near the Equator.

=== Light cone ===
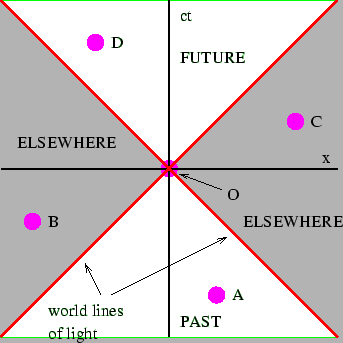
Figure 2–4. The light cone centered on an event divides the rest of spacetime into the future, the past, and "elsewhere"

In Fig. 2–4, event O is at the origin of a spacetime diagram, and the two diagonal lines represent all events that have zero spacetime interval with respect to the origin event. These two lines form what is called the light cone of the event O, since adding a second spatial dimension (Fig. 2-5) makes the appearance that of two right circular cones meeting with their apices at O. One cone extends into the future (t>0), the other into the past (t<0).

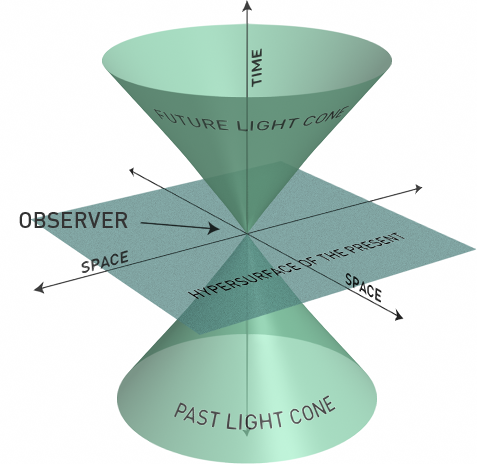
Figure 2–5. Light cone in 2D space plus a time dimension

A light (double) cone divides spacetime into separate regions with respect to its apex. The interior of the future light cone consists of all events that are separated from the apex by more time (temporal distance) than necessary to cross their spatial distance at lightspeed; these events comprise the timelike future of the event O. Likewise, the timelike past comprises the interior events of the past light cone. So in timelike intervals Δct is greater than Δx, making timelike intervals positive.

The region exterior to the light cone consists of events that are separated from the event O by more space than can be crossed at lightspeed in the given time. These events comprise the so-called spacelike region of the event O, denoted "Elsewhere" in Fig. 2-4. Events on the light cone itself are said to be lightlike (or null separated) from O. Because of the invariance of the spacetime interval, all observers will assign the same light cone to any given event, and thus will agree on this division of spacetime.

The light cone has an essential role within the concept of causality. It is possible for a not-faster-than-light-speed signal to travel from the position and time of O to the position and time of D (Fig. 2-4). It is hence possible for event O to have a causal influence on event D. The future light cone contains all the events that could be causally influenced by O. Likewise, it is possible for a not-faster-than-light-speed signal to travel from the position and time of A, to the position and time of O. The past light cone contains all the events that could have a causal influence on O. In contrast, assuming that signals cannot travel faster than the speed of light, any event, like e.g. B or C, in the spacelike region (Elsewhere), cannot either affect event O, nor can they be affected by event O employing such signalling. Under this assumption any causal relationship between event O and any events in the spacelike region of a light cone is excluded.

=== Relativity of simultaneity ===
Figure 2–6. Animation illustrating relativity of simultaneity

All observers will agree that for any given event, an event within the given event's future light cone occurs after the given event. Likewise, for any given event, an event within the given event's past light cone occurs before the given event. The before–after relationship observed for timelike-separated events remains unchanged no matter what the reference frame of the observer, i.e. no matter how the observer may be moving. The situation is quite different for spacelike-separated events. Fig. 2-4 was drawn from the reference frame of an observer moving at v = 0. From this reference frame, event C is observed to occur after event O, and event B is observed to occur before event O.

From a different reference frame, the orderings of these non-causally-related events can be reversed. In particular, one notes that if two events are simultaneous in a particular reference frame, they are necessarily separated by a spacelike interval and thus are noncausally related. The observation that simultaneity is not absolute, but depends on the observer's reference frame, is termed the relativity of simultaneity.

Fig. 2-6 illustrates the use of spacetime diagrams in the analysis of the relativity of simultaneity. The events in spacetime are invariant, but the coordinate frames transform as discussed above for Fig. 2-3. The three events (A, B, C) are simultaneous from the reference frame of an observer moving at v = 0. From the reference frame of an observer moving at v = 0.3c, the events appear to occur in the order C, B, A. From the reference frame of an observer moving at v = −0.5c, the events appear to occur in the order A, B, C. The white line represents a plane of simultaneity being moved from the past of the observer to the future of the observer, highlighting events residing on it. The gray area is the light cone of the observer, which remains invariant.

A spacelike spacetime interval gives the same distance that an observer would measure if the events being measured were simultaneous to the observer. A spacelike spacetime interval hence provides a measure of proper distance, i.e. the true distance = $\sqrt{-s^2}.$ Likewise, a timelike spacetime interval gives the same measure of time as would be presented by the cumulative ticking of a clock that moves along a given world line. A timelike spacetime interval hence provides a measure of the proper time = $\sqrt{s^2}.$

=== Invariant hyperbola ===
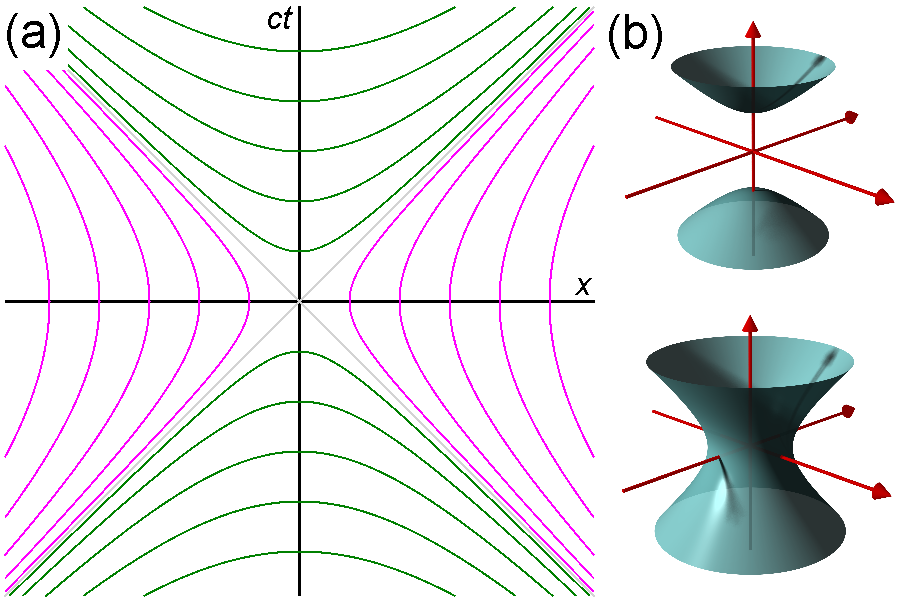
Figure 2–7. (a) Families of invariant hyperbolae, (b) Hyperboloids of two sheets and one sheet

In Euclidean space (having spatial dimensions only), the set of points equidistant (using the Euclidean metric) from some point form a circle (in two dimensions) or a sphere (in three dimensions). In (1+1)-dimensional Minkowski spacetime (having one temporal and one spatial dimension), the points at some constant spacetime interval away from the origin (using the Minkowski metric) form curves given by the two equations
$$(ct)^2 - x^2 = \pm s^2,$$
with $s^2$ some positive real constant. These equations describe two families of hyperbolae in an x–ct spacetime diagram, which are termed invariant hyperbolae.

In Fig. 2-7a, each magenta hyperbola connects all events having some fixed spacelike separation from the origin, while the green hyperbolae connect events of equal timelike separation.

The magenta hyperbolae, which cross the x axis, are timelike curves, which is to say that these hyperbolae represent actual paths that can be traversed by (constantly accelerating) particles in spacetime: Between any two events on one hyperbola a causality relation is possible, because the inverse of the slope—representing the necessary speed—for all secants is less than $c$. On the other hand, the green hyperbolae, which cross the ct axis, are spacelike curves because all intervals along these hyperbolae are spacelike intervals: No causality is possible between any two points on one of these hyperbolae, because all secants represent speeds larger than $c$.

Fig. 2-7b reflects the situation in (1+2)-dimensional Minkowski spacetime (one temporal and two spatial dimensions) with the corresponding hyperboloids. The invariant hyperbolae displaced by spacelike intervals from the origin generate hyperboloids of one sheet, while the invariant hyperbolae displaced by timelike intervals from the origin generate hyperboloids of two sheets.

The (1+2)-dimensional boundary between space- and time-like hyperboloids, established by the events forming a zero spacetime interval to the origin, is made up by degenerating the hyperboloids to the light cone. In (1+1)-dimensions the hyperbolae degenerate to the two grey 45°-lines depicted in Fig. 2-7a.

=== Time dilation and length contraction ===
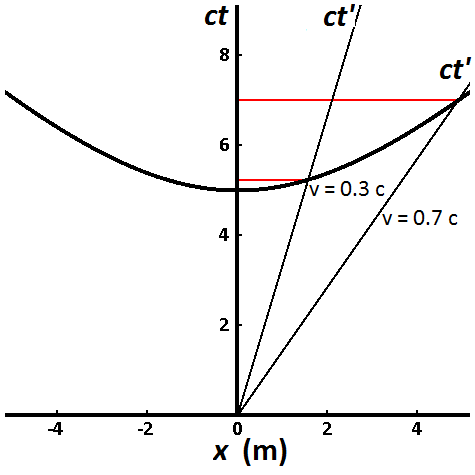
Figure 2–8. The invariant hyperbola comprises the points that can be reached from the origin in a fixed proper time by clocks traveling at different speeds

Fig. 2-8 illustrates the invariant hyperbola for all events that can be reached from the origin in a proper time of 5 meters (approximately 1.67×10^{−8} s). Different world lines represent clocks moving at different speeds. A clock that is stationary with respect to the observer has a world line that is vertical, and the elapsed time measured by the observer is the same as the proper time. For a clock traveling at 0.3 c, the elapsed time measured by the observer is 5.24 meters (1.75×10^{−8} s), while for a clock traveling at 0.7 c, the elapsed time measured by the observer is 7.00 meters (2.34×10^{−8} s).

This illustrates the phenomenon known as time dilation. Clocks that travel faster take longer (in the observer frame) to tick out the same amount of proper time, and they travel further along the x–axis within that proper time than they would have without time dilation. The measurement of time dilation by two observers in different inertial reference frames is mutual. If observer O measures the clocks of observer O′ as running slower in his frame, observer O′ in turn will measure the clocks of observer O as running slower.

Figure 2–9. In this spacetime diagram, the 1 m length of the moving rod, as measured in the primed frame, is the foreshortened distance OC when projected onto the unprimed frame.

Length contraction, like time dilation, is a manifestation of the relativity of simultaneity. Measurement of length requires measurement of the spacetime interval between two events that are simultaneous in one's frame of reference. But events that are simultaneous in one frame of reference are, in general, not simultaneous in other frames of reference.

Fig. 2-9 illustrates the motions of a 1 m rod that is traveling at 0.5 c along the x axis. The edges of the blue band represent the world lines of the rod's two endpoints. The invariant hyperbola illustrates events separated from the origin by a spacelike interval of 1 m. The endpoints O and B measured when t′ = 0 are simultaneous events in the S′ frame. But to an observer in frame S, events O and B are not simultaneous. To measure length, the observer in frame S measures the endpoints of the rod as projected onto the x-axis along their world lines. The projection of the rod's world sheet onto the x axis yields the foreshortened length OC.

(not illustrated) Drawing a vertical line through A so that it intersects the x′ axis demonstrates that, even as OB is foreshortened from the point of view of observer O, OA is likewise foreshortened from the point of view of observer O′. In the same way that each observer measures the other's clocks as running slow, each observer measures the other's rulers as being contracted.

In regards to mutual length contraction, Fig. 2-9 illustrates that the primed and unprimed frames are mutually rotated by a hyperbolic angle (analogous to ordinary angles in Euclidean geometry). (Note: In a Cartesian plane, ordinary rotation leaves a circle unchanged. In spacetime, hyperbolic rotation preserves the hyperbolic metric.) Because of this rotation, the projection of a primed meter-stick onto the unprimed x-axis is foreshortened, while the projection of an unprimed meter-stick onto the primed x′-axis is likewise foreshortened.

=== Mutual time dilation and the twin paradox ===
==== Mutual time dilation ====
Mutual time dilation and length contraction tend to strike beginners as inherently self-contradictory concepts. If an observer in frame S measures a clock, at rest in frame S', as running slower than his', while S' is moving at speed v in S, then the principle of relativity requires that an observer in frame S' likewise measures a clock in frame S, moving at speed −v in S', as running slower than hers. How two clocks can run both slower than the other, is an important question that "goes to the heart of understanding special relativity."

This apparent contradiction stems from not correctly taking into account the different settings of the necessary, related measurements. These settings allow for a consistent explanation of the only apparent contradiction. It is not about the abstract ticking of two identical clocks, but about how to measure in one frame the temporal distance of two ticks of a moving clock. It turns out that in mutually observing the duration between ticks of clocks, each moving in the respective frame, different sets of clocks must be involved. In order to measure in frame S the tick duration of a moving clock W′ (at rest in S′), one uses two additional, synchronized clocks W_{1} and W_{2} at rest in two arbitrarily fixed points in S with the spatial distance d.

Two events can be defined by the condition "two clocks are simultaneously at one place", i.e., when W′ passes each W_{1} and W_{2}. For both events the two readings of the collocated clocks are recorded. The difference of the two readings of W_{1} and W_{2} is the temporal distance of the two events in S, and their spatial distance is d. The difference of the two readings of W′ is the temporal distance of the two events in S′. In S′ these events are only separated in time, they happen at the same place in S′. Because of the invariance of the spacetime interval spanned by these two events, and the nonzero spatial separation d in S, the temporal distance in S′ must be smaller than the one in S: the smaller temporal distance between the two events, resulting from the readings of the moving clock W′, belongs to the slower running clock W′.

Conversely, for judging in frame S′ the temporal distance of two events on a moving clock W (at rest in S), one needs two clocks at rest in S′.

In this comparison the clock W is moving by with velocity −v. Recording again the four readings for the events, defined by "two clocks simultaneously at one place", results in the analogous temporal distances of the two events, now temporally and spatially separated in S′, and only temporally separated but collocated in S. To keep the spacetime interval invariant, the temporal distance in S must be smaller than in S′, because of the spatial separation of the events in S′: now clock W is observed to run slower.

The necessary recordings for the two judgements, with "one moving clock" and "two clocks at rest" in respectively S or S′, involves two different sets, each with three clocks. Since there are different sets of clocks involved in the measurements, there is no inherent necessity that the measurements be reciprocally "consistent" such that, if one observer measures the moving clock to be slow, the other observer measures the other clock to be fast.

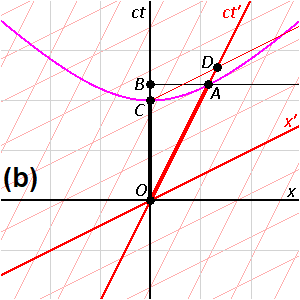
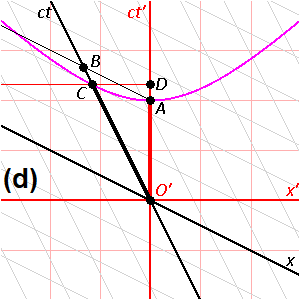
Figure 2-10. Mutual time dilation

Fig. 2-10 illustrates the previous discussion of mutual time dilation with Minkowski diagrams. The upper picture reflects the measurements as seen from frame S "at rest" with unprimed, rectangular axes, and frame S′ "moving with v > 0", coordinatized by primed, oblique axes, slanted to the right; the lower picture shows frame S′ "at rest" with primed, rectangular coordinates, and frame S "moving with −v < 0", with unprimed, oblique axes, slanted to the left.

Each line drawn parallel to a spatial axis (x, x′) represents a line of simultaneity. All events on such a line have the same time value (ct, ct′). Likewise, each line drawn parallel to a temporal axis (ct, ct′) represents a line of equal spatial coordinate values (x, x′).

One may designate in both pictures the origin O (= O′) as the event, where the respective "moving clock" is collocated with the "first clock at rest" in both comparisons. Obviously, for this event the readings on both clocks in both comparisons are zero. As a consequence, the worldlines of the moving clocks are the slanted to the right ct′-axis (upper pictures, clock W′) and the slanted to the left ct-axes (lower pictures, clock W). The worldlines of W_{1} and W′_{1} are the corresponding vertical time axes (ct in the upper pictures, and ct′ in the lower pictures).
In the upper picture the place for W_{2} is taken to be A_{x} > 0, and thus the worldline (not shown in the pictures) of this clock intersects the worldline of the moving clock (the ct′-axis) in the event labelled A, where "two clocks are simultaneously at one place". In the lower picture the place for W′_{2} is taken to be C_{x′} < 0, and so in this measurement the moving clock W passes W′_{2} in the event C.
In the upper picture the ct-coordinate A_{t} of the event A (the reading of W_{2}) is labeled B, thus giving the elapsed time between the two events, measured with W_{1} and W_{2}, as OB. For a comparison, the length of the time interval OA, measured with W′, must be transformed to the scale of the ct-axis. This is done by the invariant hyperbola (see also Fig. 2-8) through A, connecting all events with the same spacetime interval from the origin as A. This yields the event C on the ct-axis, and obviously: OC < OB, the "moving" clock W′ runs slower.

To show the mutual time dilation immediately in the upper picture, the event D may be constructed as the event at x′ = 0 (the location of clock W′ in S′), that is simultaneous to C (OC has equal spacetime interval as OA) in S′. This shows that the time interval OD is longer than OA, showing that the "moving" clock runs slower.

In the lower picture the frame S is moving with velocity −v in the frame S′ at rest. The worldline of clock W is the ct-axis (slanted to the left), the worldline of W′_{1} is the vertical ct′-axis, and the worldline of W′_{2} is the vertical through event C, with ct′-coordinate D. The invariant hyperbola through event C scales the time interval OC to OA, which is shorter than OD; also, B is constructed (similar to D in the upper pictures) as simultaneous to A in S, at x = 0. The result OB > OC corresponds again to above.

The word "measure" is important. In classical physics an observer cannot affect an observed object, but the object's state of motion can affect the observer's observations of the object.

==== Twin paradox ====
Many introductions to special relativity illustrate the differences between Galilean relativity and special relativity by posing a series of "paradoxes". These paradoxes are, in fact, ill-posed problems, resulting from our unfamiliarity with velocities comparable to the speed of light. The remedy is to solve many problems in special relativity and to become familiar with its so-called counter-intuitive predictions. The geometrical approach to studying spacetime is considered one of the best methods for developing a modern intuition.

The twin paradox is a thought experiment involving identical twins, one of whom makes a journey into space in a high-speed rocket, returning home to find that the twin who remained on Earth has aged more. This result appears puzzling because each twin observes the other twin as moving, and so at first glance, it would appear that each should find the other to have aged less. The twin paradox sidesteps the justification for mutual time dilation presented above by avoiding the requirement for a third clock. Nevertheless, the twin paradox is not a true paradox because it is easily understood within the context of special relativity.

The impression that a paradox exists stems from a misunderstanding of what special relativity states. Special relativity does not declare all frames of reference to be equivalent, only inertial frames. The traveling twin's frame is not inertial during periods when she is accelerating. Furthermore, the difference between the twins is observationally detectable: the traveling twin needs to fire her rockets to be able to return home, while the stay-at-home twin does not. (Note: Even with no (de)acceleration i.e. using one inertial frame O for constant, high-velocity outward journey and another inertial frame I for constant, high-velocity inward journey – the sum of the elapsed time in those frames (O and I) is shorter than the elapsed time in the stationary inertial frame S. Thus acceleration and deceleration is not the cause of shorter elapsed time during the outward and inward journey. Instead the use of two different constant, high-velocity inertial frames for outward and inward journey is really the cause of shorter elapsed time total. Granted, if the same twin has to travel outward and inward leg of the journey and safely switch from outward to inward leg of the journey, the acceleration and deceleration is required. If the travelling twin could ride the high-velocity outward inertial frame and instantaneously switch to high-velocity inward inertial frame the example would still work. The point is that real reason should be stated clearly. The asymmetry is because of the comparison of sum of elapsed times in two different inertial frames (O and I) to the elapsed time in a single inertial frame S.)

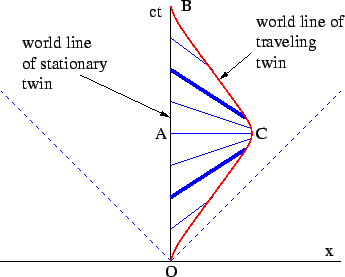
Figure 2–11. Spacetime explanation of the twin paradox

These distinctions should result in a difference in the twins' ages. The spacetime diagram of Fig. 2-11 presents the simple case of a twin going straight out along the x axis and immediately turning back. From the standpoint of the stay-at-home twin, there is nothing puzzling about the twin paradox at all. The proper time measured along the traveling twin's world line from O to C, plus the proper time measured from C to B, is less than the stay-at-home twin's proper time measured from O to A to B. More complex trajectories require integrating the proper time between the respective events along the curve (i.e. the path integral) to calculate the total amount of proper time experienced by the traveling twin.

Complications arise if the twin paradox is analyzed from the traveling twin's point of view.

Weiss's nomenclature, designating the stay-at-home twin as Terence and the traveling twin as Stella, is hereafter used.

Stella is not in an inertial frame. Given this fact, it is sometimes incorrectly stated that full resolution of the twin paradox requires general relativity:

A pure SR analysis would be as follows: Analyzed in Stella's rest frame, she is motionless for the entire trip. When she fires her rockets for the turnaround, she experiences a pseudo force which resembles a gravitational force. Figs. 2-6 and 2-11 illustrate the concept of lines (planes) of simultaneity: Lines parallel to the observer's x-axis (xy-plane) represent sets of events that are simultaneous in the observer frame. In Fig. 2-11, the blue lines connect events on Terence's world line which, from Stella's point of view, are simultaneous with events on her world line. (Terence, in turn, would observe a set of horizontal lines of simultaneity.) Throughout both the outbound and the inbound legs of Stella's journey, she measures Terence's clocks as running slower than her own. But during the turnaround (i.e. between the bold blue lines in the figure), a shift takes place in the angle of her lines of simultaneity, corresponding to a rapid skip-over of the events in Terence's world line that Stella considers to be simultaneous with her own. Therefore, at the end of her trip, Stella finds that Terence has aged more than she has.

Although general relativity is not required to analyze the twin paradox, application of the Equivalence Principle of general relativity does provide some additional insight into the subject. Stella is not stationary in an inertial frame. Analyzed in Stella's rest frame, she is motionless for the entire trip. When she is coasting her rest frame is inertial, and Terence's clock will appear to run slow. But when she fires her rockets for the turnaround, her rest frame is an accelerated frame and she experiences a force which is pushing her as if she were in a gravitational field. Terence will appear to be high up in that field and because of gravitational time dilation, his clock will appear to run fast, so much so that the net result will be that Terence has aged more than Stella when they are back together. The theoretical arguments predicting gravitational time dilation are not exclusive to general relativity. Any theory of gravity will predict gravitational time dilation if it respects the principle of equivalence, including Newton's theory.

=== Gravitation ===
This introductory section has focused on the spacetime of special relativity, since it is the easiest to describe. Minkowski spacetime is flat, takes no account of gravity, is uniform throughout, and serves as nothing more than a static background for the events that take place in it. The presence of gravity greatly complicates the description of spacetime. In general relativity, spacetime is no longer a static background, but actively interacts with the physical systems that it contains. Spacetime curves in the presence of matter, can propagate waves, bends light, and exhibits a host of other phenomena. A few of these phenomena are described in the later sections of this article.

== Basic mathematics of spacetime ==
=== Galilean transformations ===
A basic goal is to be able to compare measurements made by observers in relative motion. If there is an observer O in frame S who has measured the time and space coordinates of an event, assigning this event three Cartesian coordinates and the time as measured on his lattice of synchronized clocks (x, y, z, t) (see Fig. 1-1). A second observer O′ in a different frame S′ measures the same event in her coordinate system and her lattice of synchronized clocks (x′, y′, z′, t′). With inertial frames, neither observer is under acceleration, and a simple set of equations allows us to relate coordinates (x, y, z, t) to (x′, y′, z′, t′). Given that the two coordinate systems are in standard configuration, meaning that they are aligned with parallel (x, y, z) coordinates and that t = 0 when t′ = 0, the coordinate transformation is as follows:

$$x' = x - v t$$
$$y' = y$$
$$z' = z$$
$$t' = t .$$

Figure 3–1. Galilean spacetime and composition of velocities

Fig. 3-1 illustrates that in Newton's theory, time is universal, not the velocity of light. Consider the following thought experiment: The red arrow illustrates a train that is moving at 0.4 c with respect to the platform. Within the train, a passenger shoots a bullet with a speed of 0.4 c in the frame of the train. The blue arrow illustrates that a person standing on the train tracks measures the bullet as traveling at 0.8 c. This is in accordance with our naive expectations.

More generally, assuming that frame S′ is moving at velocity v with respect to frame S, then within frame S′, observer O′ measures an object moving with velocity u′. Velocity u with respect to frame S, since x = ut, x′ = x − vt, and t = t′, can be written as x′ = ut − vt = (u − v)t = (u − v)t′. This leads to u′ = x′/t′ and ultimately

$u' = u - v$ or $u = u' + v ,$

which is the common-sense Galilean law for the addition of velocities.

=== Relativistic composition of velocities ===
Figure 3–2. Relativistic composition of velocities

The composition of velocities is quite different in relativistic spacetime. To reduce the complexity of the equations slightly, we introduce a common shorthand for the ratio of the speed of an object relative to light,
$$\beta = v/c$$

Fig. 3-2a illustrates a red train that is moving forward at a speed given by v/c = β = s/a. From the primed frame of the train, a passenger shoots a bullet with a speed given by u′/c = β′ = n/m, where the distance is measured along a line parallel to the red x′ axis rather than parallel to the black x axis. What is the composite velocity u of the bullet relative to the platform, as represented by the blue arrow? Referring to Fig. 3-2b:

1. From the platform, the composite speed of the bullet is given by u = c(s + r)/(a + b).
2. The two yellow triangles are similar because they are right triangles that share a common angle α. In the large yellow triangle, the ratio s/a = v/c = β.
3. The ratios of corresponding sides of the two yellow triangles are constant, so that r/a = b/s = n/m = β′. So b = u′s/c and r = u′a/c.
4. Substitute the expressions for b and r into the expression for u in step 1 to yield Einstein's formula for the addition of velocities:
  $$u = {v+u'\over 1+(vu'/c^2)} .$$

The relativistic formula for addition of velocities presented above exhibits several important features:

- If u′ and v are both very small compared with the speed of light, then the product vu′/c^{2} becomes vanishingly small, and the overall result becomes indistinguishable from the Galilean formula (Newton's formula) for the addition of velocities: u = u′ + v. The Galilean formula is a special case of the relativistic formula applicable to low velocities.
- If u′ is set equal to c, then the formula yields u = c regardless of the starting value of v. The velocity of light is the same for all observers regardless their motions relative to the emitting source.

=== Time dilation and length contraction revisited ===
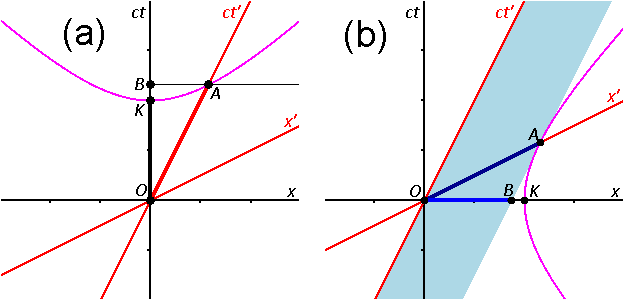
Figure 3-3. Spacetime diagrams illustrating time dilation and length contraction

It is straightforward to obtain quantitative expressions for time dilation and length contraction. Fig. 3-3 is a composite image containing individual frames taken from two previous animations, simplified and relabeled for the purposes of this section.

To reduce the complexity of the equations slightly, there are a variety of different shorthand notations for ct:

$\Tau = ct$ and $w = ct$ are common.
One also sees very frequently the use of the convention $c = 1.$

Figure 3–4. Lorentz factor as a function of velocity

In Fig. 3-3a, segments OA and OK represent equal spacetime intervals. Time dilation is represented by the ratio OB/OK. The invariant hyperbola has the equation w = √x^{2} + k^{2} where k = OK, and the red line representing the world line of a particle in motion has the equation w = x/β = xc/v. A bit of algebraic manipulation yields $OB = OK / \sqrt{1 - v^2/c^2} .$

The expression involving the square root symbol appears very frequently in relativity, and one over the expression is called the Lorentz factor, denoted by the Greek letter gamma $\gamma$:
$$\gamma = \frac{1}{\sqrt{1 - v^2/c^2}} = \frac{1}{\sqrt{1 - \beta^2}}$$

If v is greater than or equal to c, the expression for $\gamma$ becomes physically meaningless, implying that c is the maximum possible speed in nature. For any v greater than zero, the Lorentz factor will be greater than one, although the shape of the curve is such that for low speeds, the Lorentz factor is extremely close to one.

In Fig. 3-3b, segments OA and OK represent equal spacetime intervals. Length contraction is represented by the ratio OB/OK. The invariant hyperbola has the equation x = √w^{2} + k^{2}, where k = OK, and the edges of the blue band representing the world lines of the endpoints of a rod in motion have slope 1/β = c/v. Event A has coordinates (x, w) = (γk, γβk). Since the tangent line through A and B has the equation w = (x − OB)/β, we have γβk = (γk − OB)/β and
$$OB/OK = \gamma (1 - \beta ^ 2) = \frac{1}{\gamma}$$

=== Lorentz transformations ===
The Galilean transformations and their consequent commonsense law of addition of velocities work well in our ordinary low-speed world of planes, cars and balls. Beginning in the mid-1800s, however, sensitive scientific instrumentation began finding anomalies that did not fit well with the ordinary addition of velocities.

Lorentz transformations are used to transform the coordinates of an event from one frame to another in special relativity.

The Lorentz factor appears in the Lorentz transformations:
$$\begin{align}
t' &= \gamma \left( t - \frac{v x}{c^2} \right)  \\
x' &= \gamma \left( x - v t \right)\\
y' &= y \\
z' &= z
\end{align}$$

The inverse Lorentz transformations are:
$$\begin{align}
t &= \gamma \left( t' + \frac{v x'}{c^2} \right)  \\
x &= \gamma \left( x' + v t' \right)\\
y &= y' \\
z &= z'
\end{align}$$

When v ≪ c and x is small enough, the v^{2}/c^{2} and vx/c^{2} terms approach zero, and the Lorentz transformations approximate to the Galilean transformations.

$t' = \gamma ( t - v x/c^2),$ $x' = \gamma( x - v t)$ etc., most often really mean $\Delta t' = \gamma (\Delta t - v \Delta x/c^2),$ $\Delta x' = \gamma(\Delta x - v \Delta t)$ etc. Although for brevity the Lorentz transformation equations are written without deltas, x means Δx, etc. We are, in general, always concerned with the space and time differences between events.

Calling one set of transformations the normal Lorentz transformations and the other the inverse transformations is misleading, since there is no intrinsic difference between the frames. Different authors call one or the other set of transformations the "inverse" set. The forwards and inverse transformations are trivially related to each other, since the S frame can only be moving forwards or reverse with respect to S′. So inverting the equations simply entails switching the primed and unprimed variables and replacing v with −v.

Example: Terence and Stella are at an Earth-to-Mars space race. Terence is an official at the starting line, while Stella is a participant. At time t = t′ = 0, Stella's spaceship accelerates instantaneously to a speed of 0.5 c. The distance from Earth to Mars is 300 light-seconds (about 90.0×10^{6} km). Terence observes Stella crossing the finish-line clock at t = 600.00 s. But Stella observes the time on her ship chronometer to be $t^{\prime}=\gamma\left(t-v x / c^{2}\right)=519.62\ \text{s}$ as she passes the finish line, and she calculates the distance between the starting and finish lines, as measured in her frame, to be 259.81 light-seconds (about 77.9×10^{6} km). 1).

==== Deriving the Lorentz transformations ====
Figure 3–5. Derivation of Lorentz Transformation

There have been many dozens of derivations of the Lorentz transformations since Einstein's original work in 1905, each with its particular focus. Although Einstein's derivation was based on the invariance of the speed of light, there are other physical principles that may serve as starting points. Ultimately, these alternative starting points can be considered different expressions of the underlying principle of locality, which states that the influence that one particle exerts on another can not be transmitted instantaneously.

The derivation given here and illustrated in Fig. 3-5 is based on one presented by Bais and makes use of previous results from the Relativistic Composition of Velocities, Time Dilation, and Length Contraction sections. Event P has coordinates (w, x) in the black "rest system" and coordinates (w′, x′) in the red frame that is moving with velocity parameter β = v/c. To determine w′ and x′ in terms of w and x (or the other way around) it is easier at first to derive the inverse Lorentz transformation.

1. There can be no such thing as length expansion/contraction in the transverse directions. y' must equal y and z′ must equal z, otherwise whether a fast moving 1 m ball could fit through a 1 m circular hole would depend on the observer. The first postulate of relativity states that all inertial frames are equivalent, and transverse expansion/contraction would violate this law.
2. From the drawing, w = a + b and x = r + s
3. From previous results using similar triangles, we know that s/a = b/r = v/c = β.
4. Because of time dilation, a = γw′
5. Substituting equation (4) into s/a = β yields s = γw′β.
6. Length contraction and similar triangles give us r = γx′ and b = βr = βγx′
7. Substituting the expressions for s, a, r and b into the equations in Step 2 immediately yield
  $$\begin{align}
w &= \gamma w' + \beta \gamma x' \\
x &= \gamma x' + \beta \gamma w'
\end{align}$$

The above equations are alternate expressions for the t and x equations of the inverse Lorentz transformation, as can be seen by substituting ct for w, ct′ for w′, and v/c for β. From the inverse transformation, the equations of the forwards transformation can be derived by solving for t′ and x′.

==== Linearity of the Lorentz transformations ====
The Lorentz transformations have a mathematical property called linearity, since x′ and t′ are obtained as linear combinations of x and t, with no higher powers involved. The linearity of the transformation reflects a fundamental property of spacetime that was tacitly assumed in the derivation, namely, that the properties of inertial frames of reference are independent of location and time. In the absence of gravity, spacetime looks the same everywhere. All inertial observers will agree on what constitutes accelerating and non-accelerating motion. Any one observer can use her own measurements of space and time, but there is nothing absolute about them. Another observer's conventions will do just as well.

A result of linearity is that if two Lorentz transformations are applied sequentially, the result is also a Lorentz transformation.

Example: Terence observes Stella speeding away from him at 0.500 c, and he can use the Lorentz transformations with β = 0.500 to relate Stella's measurements to his own. Stella, in her frame, observes Ursula traveling away from her at 0.250 c, and she can use the Lorentz transformations with β = 0.250 to relate Ursula's measurements with her own. Because of the linearity of the transformations and the relativistic composition of velocities, Terence can use the Lorentz transformations with β = 0.666 to relate Ursula's measurements with his own.

=== Doppler effect ===
The Doppler effect is the change in frequency or wavelength of a wave for a receiver and source in relative motion. For simplicity, we consider here two basic scenarios: (1) The motions of the source and/or receiver are exactly along the line connecting them (longitudinal Doppler effect), and (2) the motions are at right angles to the said line (transverse Doppler effect). We are ignoring scenarios where they move along intermediate angles.

==== Longitudinal Doppler effect ====
The classical Doppler analysis deals with waves that are propagating in a medium, such as sound waves or water ripples, and which are transmitted between sources and receivers that are moving towards or away from each other. The analysis of such waves depends on whether the source, the receiver, or both are moving relative to the medium. Given the scenario where the receiver is stationary with respect to the medium, and the source is moving directly away from the receiver at a speed of v_{s} for a velocity parameter of β_{s}, the wavelength is increased, and the observed frequency f is given by
$$f = \frac{1}{1+\beta _s}f_0$$

On the other hand, given the scenario where source is stationary, and the receiver is moving directly away from the source at a speed of v_{r} for a velocity parameter of β_{r}, the wavelength is not changed, but the transmission velocity of the waves relative to the receiver is decreased, and the observed frequency f is given by
$$f = (1-\beta _r)f_0$$

Figure 3–6. Spacetime diagram of relativistic Doppler effect

Light, unlike sound or water ripples, does not propagate through a medium, and there is no distinction between a source moving away from the receiver or a receiver moving away from the source. Fig. 3-6 illustrates a relativistic spacetime diagram showing a source separating from the receiver with a velocity parameter $\beta ,$ so that the separation between source and receiver at time $w$ is $\beta w$. Because of time dilation, $w = \gamma w' .$ Since the slope of the green light ray is −1, $T = w + \beta w = \gamma w' (1 + \beta) .$ Hence, the relativistic Doppler effect is given by
$$f = \sqrt{\frac{1 - \beta}{1 + \beta}}\,f_0.$$

==== Transverse Doppler effect ====
Figure 3–7. Transverse Doppler effect scenarios

Suppose that a source and a receiver, both approaching each other in uniform inertial motion along non-intersecting lines, are at their closest approach to each other. It would appear that the classical analysis predicts that the receiver detects no Doppler shift. Due to subtleties in the analysis, that expectation is not necessarily true. Nevertheless, when appropriately defined, transverse Doppler shift is a relativistic effect that has no classical analog. The subtleties are these:

- Fig. 3-7a. What is the frequency measurement when the receiver is geometrically at its closest approach to the source? This scenario is most easily analyzed from the frame S′ of the source. (Note: The ease of analyzing a relativistic scenario often depends on the frame in which one chooses to perform the analysis. In this linked image, we present alternative views of the transverse Doppler shift scenario where source and receiver are at their closest approach to each other. (a) If we analyze the scenario in the frame of the receiver, we find that the analysis is more complicated than it should be. The apparent position of a celestial object is displaced from its true position (or geometric position) because of the object's motion during the time it takes its light to reach an observer. The source would be time-dilated relative to the receiver, but the redshift implied by this time dilation would be offset by a blueshift due to the longitudinal component of the relative motion between the receiver and the apparent position of the source. (b) It is much easier if, instead, we analyze the scenario from the frame of the source. An observer situated at the source knows, from the problem statement, that the receiver is at its closest point to him. That means that the receiver has no longitudinal component of motion to complicate the analysis. Since the receiver's clocks are time-dilated relative to the source, the light that the receiver receives is therefore blue-shifted by a factor of gamma.)
- Fig. 3-7b. What is the frequency measurement when the receiver sees the source as being closest to it? This scenario is most easily analyzed from the frame S of the receiver.

Two other scenarios are commonly examined in discussions of transverse Doppler shift:

- Fig. 3-7c. If the receiver is moving in a circle around the source, what frequency does the receiver measure?
- Fig. 3-7d. If the source is moving in a circle around the receiver, what frequency does the receiver measure?

In scenario (a), the point of closest approach is frame-independent and represents the moment where there is no change in distance versus time (i.e. dr/dt = 0 where r is the distance between receiver and source) and hence no longitudinal Doppler shift. The source observes the receiver as being illuminated by light of frequency f′, but also observes the receiver as having a time-dilated clock. In frame S, the receiver is therefore illuminated by blueshifted light of frequency
$$f = f' \gamma = f' / \sqrt { 1 - \beta ^2  }$$

In scenario (b) the illustration shows the receiver being illuminated by light from when the source was closest to the receiver, even though the source has moved on. Because the source's clocks are time dilated as measured in frame S, and since dr/dt was equal to zero at this point, the light from the source, emitted from this closest point, is redshifted with frequency
$$f = f' / \gamma = f' \sqrt { 1 - \beta ^2  }$$

Scenarios (c) and (d) can be analyzed by simple time dilation arguments. In (c), the receiver observes light from the source as being blueshifted by a factor of $\gamma$, and in (d), the light is redshifted. The only seeming complication is that the orbiting objects are in accelerated motion. However, if an inertial observer looks at an accelerating clock, only the clock's instantaneous speed is important when computing time dilation. (The converse, however, is not true.) Most reports of transverse Doppler shift refer to the effect as a redshift and analyze the effect in terms of scenarios (b) or (d). (Note: Not all experiments characterize the effect in terms of a redshift. For example, the Kündig experiment measures transverse blueshift using a Mössbauer source setup at the center of a centrifuge rotor and an absorber at the rim.)

=== Energy and momentum ===
==== Extending momentum to four dimensions ====
Figure 3–8. Relativistic spacetime momentum vector. The coordinate axes of the rest frame are: momentum, p, and mass * c. For comparison, we have overlaid a spacetime coordinate system with axes: position, and time * c.

In classical mechanics, the state of motion of a particle is characterized by its mass and its velocity. Linear momentum, the product of a particle's mass and velocity, is a vector quantity, possessing the same direction as the velocity: p = mv. It is a conserved quantity, meaning that if a closed system is not affected by external forces, its total linear momentum cannot change.

In relativistic mechanics, the momentum vector is extended to four dimensions. Added to the momentum vector is a time component that allows the spacetime momentum vector to transform like the spacetime position vector $(x,t)$. In exploring the properties of the spacetime momentum, we start, in Fig. 3-8a, by examining what a particle looks like at rest. In the rest frame, the spatial component of the momentum is zero, i.e. p = 0, but the time component equals mc.

We can obtain the transformed components of this vector in the moving frame by using the Lorentz transformations, or we can read it directly from the figure because we know that $(m c)^{\prime}=\gamma m c$ and $p^{\prime}=-\beta \gamma m c$, since the red axes are rescaled by gamma. Fig. 3-8b illustrates the situation as it appears in the moving frame. It is apparent that the space and time components of the four-momentum go to infinity as the velocity of the moving frame approaches c.

We will use this information shortly to obtain an expression for the four-momentum.

==== Momentum of light ====
Figure 3–9. Energy and momentum of light in different inertial frames

Light particles, or photons, travel at the speed of c, the constant that is conventionally known as the speed of light. This statement is not a tautology, since many modern formulations of relativity do not start with constant speed of light as a postulate. Photons therefore propagate along a lightlike world line and, in appropriate units, have equal space and time components for every observer.

A consequence of Maxwell's theory of electromagnetism is that light carries energy and momentum, and that their ratio is a constant: $E/p = c$. Rearranging, $E/c = p$, and since for photons, the space and time components are equal, E/c must therefore be equated with the time component of the spacetime momentum vector.

Photons travel at the speed of light, yet have finite momentum and energy. For this to be so, the mass term in γmc must be zero, meaning that photons are massless particles. Infinity times zero is an ill-defined quantity, but E/c is well-defined.

By this analysis, if the energy of a photon equals E in the rest frame, it equals $E^{\prime}=(1-\beta) \gamma E$ in a moving frame. This result can be derived by inspection of Fig. 3-9 or by application of the Lorentz transformations, and is consistent with the analysis of Doppler effect given previously.

==== Mass–energy relationship ====
Consideration of the interrelationships between the various components of the relativistic momentum vector led Einstein to several important conclusions.

- In the low speed limit as β = v/c approaches zero, γ approaches 1, so the spatial component of the relativistic momentum $\beta \gamma m c=\gamma m v$ approaches mv, the classical term for momentum. Following this perspective, γm can be interpreted as a relativistic generalization of m. Einstein proposed that the relativistic mass of an object increases with velocity according to the formula $m_\text{rel}=\gamma m$.
- Likewise, comparing the time component of the relativistic momentum with that of the photon, $\gamma m c=m_\text{rel} c=E / c$, so that Einstein arrived at the relationship $E=m_\text{rel} c^{2}$. Simplified to the case of zero velocity, this is Einstein's equation relating energy and mass.

Another way of looking at the relationship between mass and energy is to consider a series expansion of γmc^{2} at low velocity:
$$\begin{align}
E &= \gamma m c^2 = \frac{m c^2}{\sqrt{1 - \beta ^ 2}} \\
&= m c^2 + \frac{1}{2} m v^2 + \cdots
\end{align}$$
The second term is just an expression for the kinetic energy of the particle. Mass indeed appears to be another form of energy.

The concept of relativistic mass that Einstein introduced in 1905, m_{rel}, although amply validated every day in particle accelerators around the globe (or indeed in any instrumentation whose use depends on high velocity particles, such as electron microscopes, old-fashioned color television sets, etc.), has nevertheless not proven to be a fruitful concept in physics in the sense that it is not a concept that has served as a basis for other theoretical development. Relativistic mass, for instance, plays no role in general relativity.

For this reason, as well as for pedagogical concerns, most physicists currently prefer a different terminology when referring to the relationship between mass and energy. "Relativistic mass" is a deprecated term. The term "mass" by itself refers to the rest mass or invariant mass, and is equal to the invariant length of the relativistic momentum vector. Expressed as a formula,
$$E^2 - p^2c^2 = m_\text{rest}^2 c^4$$
This formula applies to all particles, massless as well as massive. For photons where m_{rest} equals zero, it yields, $E=\pm p c$.

==== Four-momentum ====
Because of the close relationship between mass and energy, the four-momentum (also called 4-momentum) is also called the energy–momentum 4-vector. Using an uppercase P to represent the four-momentum and a lowercase p to denote the spatial momentum, the four-momentum may be written as
$$P \equiv (E/c, \vec{p}) = (E/c, p_x, p_y, p_z)$$
or alternatively, using the convention that $c = 1 ,$
$$P \equiv (E, \vec{p}) = (E, p_x, p_y, p_z) .$$

=== Conservation laws ===
In physics, conservation laws state that certain particular measurable properties of an isolated physical system do not change as the system evolves over time. In 1915, Emmy Noether discovered that underlying each conservation law is a fundamental symmetry of nature. The fact that physical processes do not care where in space they take place (space translation symmetry) yields conservation of momentum, the fact that such processes do not care when they take place (time translation symmetry) yields conservation of energy, and so on. In this section, we examine the Newtonian views of conservation of mass, momentum and energy from a relativistic perspective.

==== Total momentum ====
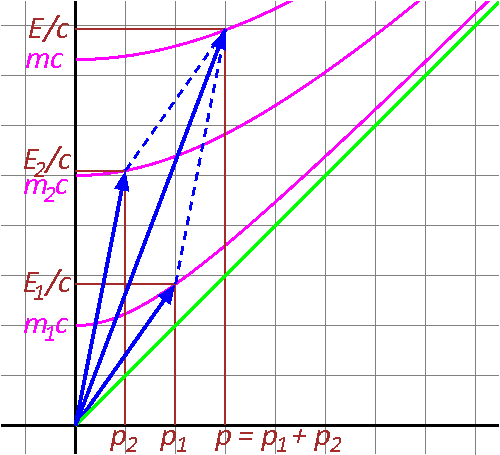
Figure 3–10. Relativistic conservation of momentum

To understand how the Newtonian view of conservation of momentum needs to be modified in a relativistic context, we examine the problem of two colliding bodies limited to a single dimension.

In Newtonian mechanics, two extreme cases of this problem may be distinguished yielding mathematics of minimum complexity:

1. The two bodies rebound from each other in a completely elastic collision.
2. The two bodies stick together and continue moving as a single particle. This second case is the case of completely inelastic collision.

For both cases (1) and (2), momentum, mass, and total energy are conserved. However, kinetic energy is not conserved in cases of inelastic collision. A certain fraction of the initial kinetic energy is converted to heat.

In case (2), two masses with momentums $\boldsymbol{p}_{\boldsymbol{1} }=m_{1} \boldsymbol{v}_{\boldsymbol{1} }$ and $\boldsymbol{p}_{\boldsymbol{2} }=m_{2} \boldsymbol{v}_{\boldsymbol{2} }$ collide to produce a single particle of conserved mass $m=m_{1}+m_{2}$ traveling at the center of mass velocity of the original system, $\boldsymbol{v_{c m}}=\left(m_{1} \boldsymbol{v_1}+m_{2} \boldsymbol{v_2}\right) /\left(m_{1}+m_{2}\right)$. The total momentum $\boldsymbol{p=p_{1}+p_{2} }$ is conserved.

Fig. 3-10 illustrates the inelastic collision of two particles from a relativistic perspective. The time components $E_{1} / c$ and $E_{2} / c$ add up to total E/c of the resultant vector, meaning that energy is conserved. Likewise, the space components $\boldsymbol{p_{1} }$ and $\boldsymbol{p_{2} }$ add up to form p of the resultant vector. The four-momentum is, as expected, a conserved quantity. However, the invariant mass of the fused particle, given by the point where the invariant hyperbola of the total momentum intersects the energy axis, is not equal to the sum of the invariant masses of the individual particles that collided. Indeed, it is larger than the sum of the individual masses: $m>m_{1}+m_{2}$.

Looking at the events of this scenario in reverse sequence, we see that non-conservation of mass is a common occurrence: when an unstable elementary particle spontaneously decays into two lighter particles, total energy is conserved, but the mass is not. Part of the mass is converted into kinetic energy.

==== Choice of reference frames ====
Figure 3-11.
(above) Lab Frame.
(right) Center of Momentum Frame.

The freedom to choose any frame in which to perform an analysis allows us to pick one which may be particularly convenient. For analysis of momentum and energy problems, the most convenient frame is usually the "center-of-momentum frame" (also called the zero-momentum frame, or COM frame). This is the frame in which the space component of the system's total momentum is zero. Fig. 3-11 illustrates the breakup of a high speed particle into two daughter particles. In the lab frame, the daughter particles are preferentially emitted in a direction oriented along the original particle's trajectory. In the COM frame, however, the two daughter particles are emitted in opposite directions, although their masses and the magnitude of their velocities are generally not the same.

==== Energy and momentum conservation ====
In a Newtonian analysis of interacting particles, transformation between frames is simple because all that is necessary is to apply the Galilean transformation to all velocities. Since $v' = v - u$, the momentum $p' = p - mu$. If the total momentum of an interacting system of particles is observed to be conserved in one frame, it will likewise be observed to be conserved in any other frame.

Conservation of momentum in the COM frame amounts to the requirement that p = 0 both before and after collision. In the Newtonian analysis, conservation of mass dictates that $m=m_{1}+m_{2}$. In the simplified, one-dimensional scenarios that we have been considering, only one additional constraint is necessary before the outgoing momenta of the particles can be determined—an energy condition. In the one-dimensional case of a completely elastic collision with no loss of kinetic energy, the outgoing velocities of the rebounding particles in the COM frame will be precisely equal and opposite to their incoming velocities. In the case of a completely inelastic collision with total loss of kinetic energy, the outgoing velocities of the rebounding particles will be zero.

Newtonian momenta, calculated as $p = mv$, fail to behave properly under Lorentzian transformation. The linear transformation of velocities $v' = v - u$ is replaced by the highly nonlinear $v^{\prime} = (v-u) / (1- {v u}/{ c^{2} } )$ so that a calculation demonstrating conservation of momentum in one frame will be invalid in other frames. Einstein was faced with either having to give up conservation of momentum, or to change the definition of momentum. This second option was what he chose.

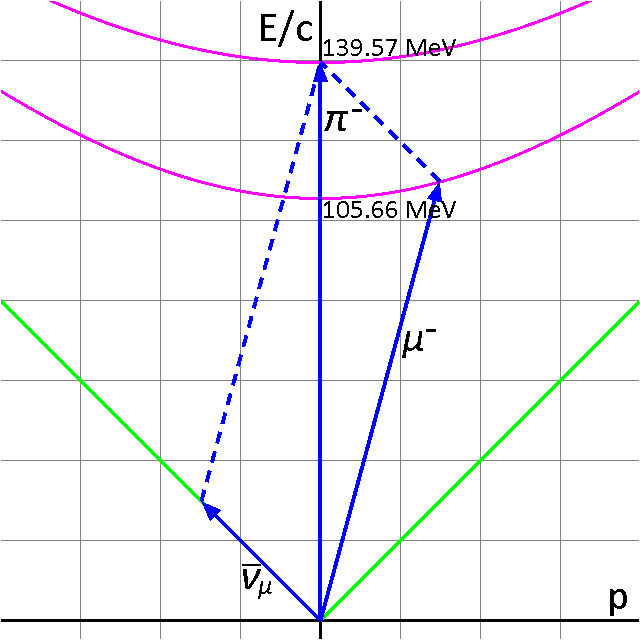
Figure 3-12a. Energy–momentum diagram for decay of a charged pion.

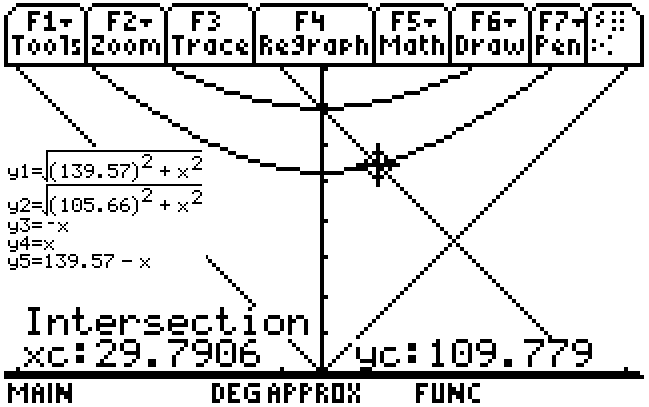
Figure 3-12b. Graphing calculator analysis of charged pion decay.

The relativistic conservation law for energy and momentum replaces the three classical conservation laws for energy, momentum and mass. Mass is no longer conserved independently, because it has been subsumed into the total relativistic energy. This makes the relativistic conservation of energy a simpler concept than in nonrelativistic mechanics, because the total energy is conserved without any qualifications. Kinetic energy converted into heat or internal potential energy shows up as an increase in mass.

Example: Because of the equivalence of mass and energy, elementary particle masses are customarily stated in energy units, where 1 MeV = 10^{6} electron volts. A charged pion is a particle of mass 139.57 MeV (approx. 273 times the electron mass). It is unstable, and decays into a muon of mass 105.66 MeV (approx. 207 times the electron mass) and an antineutrino, which has an almost negligible mass. The difference between the pion mass and the muon mass is 33.91 MeV.
π^{−} → μ^{−} + ν̅_{μ}

Fig. 3-12a illustrates the energy–momentum diagram for this decay reaction in the rest frame of the pion. Because of its negligible mass, a neutrino travels at very nearly the speed of light. The relativistic expression for its energy, like that of the photon, is $E_{v}=p c,$ which is also the value of the space component of its momentum. To conserve momentum, the muon has the same value of the space component of the neutrino's momentum, but in the opposite direction.

Algebraic analyses of the energetics of this decay reaction are available online, so Fig. 3-12b presents instead a graphing calculator solution. The energy of the neutrino is 29.79 MeV, and the energy of the muon is 33.91 MeV − 29.79 MeV = 4.12 MeV. Most of the energy is carried off by the near-zero-mass neutrino.

== Introduction to curved spacetime ==
Newton's theories assumed that motion takes place against the backdrop of a rigid Euclidean reference frame that extends throughout all space and all time. Gravity is mediated by a mysterious force, acting instantaneously across a distance, whose actions are independent of the intervening space. (Note: Newton himself was acutely aware of the inherent difficulties with these assumptions, but as a practical matter, making these assumptions was the only way that he could make progress. In 1692, he wrote to his friend Richard Bentley: "That Gravity should be innate, inherent and essential to Matter, so that one body may act upon another at a distance thro' a Vacuum, without the Mediation of any thing else, by and through which their Action and Force may be conveyed from one to another, is to me so great an Absurdity that I believe no Man who has in philosophical Matters a competent Faculty of thinking can ever fall into it.") In contrast, Einstein denied that there is any background Euclidean reference frame that extends throughout space. Nor is there any such thing as a force of gravitation, only the structure of spacetime itself.

Figure 1. Tidal effects.

In spacetime terms, the path of a satellite orbiting the Earth is not dictated by the distant influences of the Earth, Moon and Sun. Instead, the satellite moves through space only in response to local conditions. Since spacetime is everywhere locally flat when considered on a sufficiently small scale, the satellite is always following a straight line in its local inertial frame. We say that the satellite always follows along the path of a geodesic. No evidence of gravitation can be discovered following alongside the motions of a single particle.

In any analysis of spacetime, evidence of gravitation requires that one observe the relative accelerations of two bodies or two separated particles. In Fig. 1, two separated particles, free-falling in the gravitational field of the Earth, exhibit tidal accelerations due to local inhomogeneities in the gravitational field such that each particle follows a different path through spacetime. The tidal accelerations that these particles exhibit with respect to each other do not require forces for their explanation. Rather, Einstein described them in terms of the geometry of spacetime, i.e. the curvature of spacetime. These tidal accelerations are strictly local. It is the cumulative total effect of many local manifestations of curvature that result in the appearance of a gravitational force acting at a long range from Earth.

Different observers viewing the scenarios presented in this figure interpret the scenarios differently depending on their knowledge of the situation. (i) A first observer, at the center of mass of particles 2 and 3 but unaware of the large mass 1, concludes that a force of repulsion exists between the particles in scenario A while a force of attraction exists between the particles in scenario B. (ii) A second observer, aware of the large mass 1, smiles at the first reporter's naiveté. This second observer knows that in reality, the apparent forces between particles 2 and 3 really represent tidal effects resulting from their differential attraction by mass 1. (iii) A third observer, trained in general relativity, knows that there are, in fact, no forces at all acting between the three objects. Rather, all three objects move along geodesics in spacetime.

Two central propositions underlie general relativity.

- The first crucial concept is coordinate independence: The laws of physics cannot depend on what coordinate system one uses. This is a major extension of the principle of relativity from the version used in special relativity, which states that the laws of physics must be the same for every observer moving in non-accelerated (inertial) reference frames. In general relativity, to use Einstein's own (translated) words, "the laws of physics must be of such a nature that they apply to systems of reference in any kind of motion." This leads to an immediate issue: In accelerated frames, one feels forces that seemingly would enable one to assess one's state of acceleration in an absolute sense. Einstein resolved this problem through the principle of equivalence.

Figure 2. Equivalence principle

- The equivalence principle states that in any sufficiently small region of space, the effects of gravitation are the same as those from acceleration.
  In Fig. 2, person A is in a spaceship, far from any massive objects, that undergoes a uniform acceleration of g. Person B is in a box resting on Earth. Provided that the spaceship is sufficiently small so that tidal effects are non-measurable, there are no experiments that A and B can perform which will enable them to tell which setting they are in.
  An alternative expression of the equivalence principle is to note that in Newton's universal law of gravitation, F = GMm_{g}/r^{2} = m_{g}g and in Newton's second law, F = m_{i}a, there is no a priori reason why the gravitational mass m_{g} should be equal to the inertial mass m_{i}. The equivalence principle states that these two masses are identical.

To go from the elementary description above of curved spacetime to a complete description of gravitation requires tensor calculus and differential geometry, topics both requiring considerable study. Without these mathematical tools, it is possible to write about general relativity, but it is not possible to demonstrate any non-trivial derivations.

== Technical topics ==
=== Is spacetime really curved? ===
In Poincaré's conventionalist views, the essential criteria according to which one should select a Euclidean versus non-Euclidean geometry would be economy and simplicity. A realist would say that Einstein discovered spacetime to be non-Euclidean. A conventionalist would say that Einstein merely found it more convenient to use non-Euclidean geometry. The conventionalist would maintain that Einstein's analysis said nothing about what the geometry of spacetime really is.

Such being said,

1. Is it possible to represent general relativity in terms of flat spacetime?
2. Are there any situations where a flat spacetime interpretation of general relativity may be more convenient than the usual curved spacetime interpretation?

In response to the first question, a number of authors including Deser, Grishchuk, Rosen, Weinberg, etc. have provided various formulations of gravitation as a field in a flat manifold. Those theories are variously called "bimetric gravity", the "field-theoretical approach to general relativity", and so forth. Kip Thorne has provided a popular review of these theories.

The flat spacetime paradigm posits that matter creates a gravitational field that causes rulers to shrink when they are turned from circumferential orientation to radial, and that causes the ticking rates of clocks to dilate. The flat spacetime paradigm is fully equivalent to the curved spacetime paradigm in that they both represent the same physical phenomena. However, their mathematical formulations are entirely different. Working physicists routinely switch between using curved and flat spacetime techniques depending on the requirements of the problem. The flat spacetime paradigm is convenient when performing approximate calculations in weak fields. Hence, flat spacetime techniques tend be used when solving gravitational wave problems, while curved spacetime techniques tend be used in the analysis of black holes.

=== Asymptotic symmetries ===
The spacetime symmetry group for Special Relativity is the Poincaré group, which is a ten-dimensional group of three Lorentz boosts, three rotations, and four spacetime translations. It is logical to ask what symmetries if any might apply in General Relativity. A tractable case might be to consider the symmetries of spacetime as seen by observers located far away from all sources of the gravitational field. The naive expectation for asymptotically flat spacetime symmetries might be simply to extend and reproduce the symmetries of flat spacetime of special relativity, viz., the Poincaré group.

In 1962 Hermann Bondi, M. G. van der Burg, A. W. Metzner and Rainer K. Sachs addressed this asymptotic symmetry problem in order to investigate the flow of energy at infinity due to propagating gravitational waves. Their first step was to decide on some physically sensible boundary conditions to place on the gravitational field at lightlike infinity to characterize what it means to say a metric is asymptotically flat, making no a priori assumptions about the nature of the asymptotic symmetry group—not even the assumption that such a group exists. Then after designing what they considered to be the most sensible boundary conditions, they investigated the nature of the resulting asymptotic symmetry transformations that leave invariant the form of the boundary conditions appropriate for asymptotically flat gravitational fields.

What they found was that the asymptotic symmetry transformations actually do form a group and the structure of this group does not depend on the particular gravitational field that happens to be present. This means that, as expected, one can separate the kinematics of spacetime from the dynamics of the gravitational field at least at spatial infinity. The puzzling surprise in 1962 was their discovery of a rich infinite-dimensional group (the so-called BMS group) as the asymptotic symmetry group, instead of the finite-dimensional Poincaré group, which is a subgroup of the BMS group. Not only are the Lorentz transformations asymptotic symmetry transformations, there are also additional transformations that are not Lorentz transformations but are asymptotic symmetry transformations. In fact, they found an additional infinity of transformation generators known as supertranslations. This implies the conclusion that General Relativity (GR) does not reduce to special relativity in the case of weak fields at long distances.

=== Riemannian geometry ===
Riemannian geometry is the branch of differential geometry that studies Riemannian manifolds. An example of a Riemannian manifold is a surface, on which distances are measured by the length of curves on the surface. Riemannian geometry is the study of surfaces and their higher-dimensional analogs (called manifolds), in which distances are calculated along curves belonging to the manifold. Formally, Riemannian geometry is the study of smooth manifolds with a Riemannian metric (an inner product on the tangent space at each point that varies smoothly from point to point). This gives, in particular, local notions of angle, length of curves, surface area and volume. From those, some other global quantities can be derived by integrating local contributions.

Riemannian geometry originated with the vision of Bernhard Riemann expressed in his inaugural lecture "Über die Hypothesen, welche der Geometrie zu Grunde liegen" ("On the Hypotheses on which Geometry is Based"). It is a very broad and abstract generalization of the differential geometry of surfaces in R^{3}. Development of Riemannian geometry resulted in synthesis of diverse results concerning the geometry of surfaces and the behavior of geodesics on them, with techniques that can be applied to the study of differentiable manifolds of higher dimensions. It enabled the formulation of Einstein's general theory of relativity, made profound impact on group theory and representation theory, as well as analysis, and spurred the development of algebraic and differential topology.

=== Curved manifolds ===
For physical reasons, a spacetime continuum is mathematically defined as a four-dimensional, smooth, connected Lorentzian manifold $(M, g)$. This means the smooth Lorentz metric $g$ has signature $(3,1)$. The metric determines the geometry of spacetime, as well as determining the geodesics of particles and light beams. About each point (event) on this manifold, coordinate charts are used to represent observers in reference frames. Usually, Cartesian coordinates $(x, y, z, t)$ are used. Moreover, for simplicity's sake, units of measurement are usually chosen such that the speed of light $c$ is equal to 1.

A reference frame (observer) can be identified with one of these coordinate charts; any such observer can describe any event $p$. Another reference frame may be identified by a second coordinate chart about $p$. Two observers (one in each reference frame) may describe the same event $p$ but obtain different descriptions.

Usually, many overlapping coordinate charts are needed to cover a manifold. Given two coordinate charts, one containing $p$ (representing an observer) and another containing $q$ (representing another observer), the intersection of the charts represents the region of spacetime in which both observers can measure physical quantities and hence compare results. The relation between the two sets of measurements is given by a non-singular coordinate transformation on this intersection. The idea of coordinate charts as local observers who can perform measurements in their vicinity also makes good physical sense, as this is how one actually collects physical data—locally.

For example, two observers, one of whom is on Earth, but the other one who is on a fast rocket to Jupiter, may observe a comet crashing into Jupiter (this is the event $p$). In general, they will disagree about the exact location and timing of this impact, i.e., they will have different 4-tuples $(x, y, z, t)$ (as they are using different coordinate systems). Although their kinematic descriptions will differ, dynamical (physical) laws, such as momentum conservation and the first law of thermodynamics, will still hold. In fact, relativity theory requires more than this in the sense that it stipulates these (and all other physical) laws must take the same form in all coordinate systems. This introduces tensors into relativity, by which all physical quantities are represented.

Geodesics are said to be timelike, null, or spacelike if the tangent vector to one point of the geodesic is of this nature. Paths of particles and light beams in spacetime are represented by timelike and null (lightlike) geodesics, respectively.

=== Privileged character of 3+1 spacetime ===
Properties of (n + m)-dimensional spacetimes

There are two kinds of dimensions: spatial (bidirectional) and temporal (unidirectional). Let the number of spatial dimensions be N and the number of temporal dimensions be T. That N = 3 and T = 1—setting aside the compactified dimensions invoked by string theory which have been, to date, undetected—can be explained by appealing to the physical consequences of letting N differ from 3 and T differ from 1. The argument is often of an anthropic character and possibly the first of its kind, albeit before the complete concept came into vogue.

The implicit notion that the dimensionality of the universe is special is first attributed to Gottfried Wilhelm Leibniz, who in the Discourse on Metaphysics suggested that the world is "the one which is at the same time the simplest in hypothesis and the richest in phenomena". Immanuel Kant argued that 3-dimensional space was a consequence of the inverse square law of universal gravitation. While Kant's argument is historically important, John D. Barrow said that it "gets the punch-line back to front: it is the three-dimensionality of space that explains why we see inverse-square force laws in Nature, not vice-versa" (Barrow 2002:204). (Note: This is because the law of gravitation (or any other inverse-square law) follows from the concept of flux and the proportional relationship of flux density and field strength. If N = 3, then 3-dimensional solid objects have surface areas proportional to the square of their size in any selected spatial dimension. In particular, a sphere of radius r has a surface area of 4πr^{2}. More generally, in a space of N dimensions, the strength of the gravitational attraction between two bodies separated by a distance of r would be inversely proportional to r^{N−1}.)

In 1920, Paul Ehrenfest showed that if there is only a single time dimension and more than three spatial dimensions, the orbit of a planet about its Sun cannot remain stable. The same is true of a star's orbit around the center of its galaxy. Ehrenfest also showed that if there are an even number of spatial dimensions and at least four, then the different parts of a wave impulse will travel at different speeds. If there are an odd number of spatial dimensions and at least five, then wave impulses become distorted. In 1922, Hermann Weyl claimed that Maxwell's theory of electromagnetism can be expressed in terms of an action only for a four-dimensional manifold. Finally, Tangherlini showed in 1963 that when there are more than three spatial dimensions, electron orbitals around nuclei cannot be stable; electrons would either fall into the nucleus or disperse.

Max Tegmark expands on the preceding argument in the following anthropic manner. If T differs from 1, the behavior of physical systems could not be predicted reliably from knowledge of the relevant partial differential equations. In such a universe, intelligent life capable of manipulating technology could not emerge. Moreover, if T > 1, Tegmark maintains that protons and electrons would be unstable and could decay into particles having greater mass than themselves. (This does not occur if the particles have a sufficiently low temperature.)

Lastly, if N < 3, gravitation of any kind becomes problematic, and the universe would probably be too simple to contain observers. For example, when N < 3, nerves cannot cross without intersecting. Hence anthropic and other arguments rule out all cases except N = 3 and T = 1, which describes the world around us. However, in 2019, James Scargill argued that complex life may be possible with two spatial dimensions. According to Scargill, a purely scalar theory of gravity may enable a local gravitational force, and 2D networks may be sufficient for complex neural networks.

On the other hand, in view of creating black holes from an ideal monatomic gas under its self-gravity, Wei-Xiang Feng showed that (3 + 1)-dimensional spacetime is the marginal dimensionality. Moreover, it is the unique dimensionality that can afford a "stable" gas sphere with a "positive" cosmological constant. However, a self-gravitating gas cannot be stably bound if the mass sphere is larger than ~10^{21} solar masses, due to the small positivity of the cosmological constant observed.

== See also ==
- Basic introduction to the mathematics of curved spacetime
- Complex spacetime
- Einstein's thought experiments
- Four-dimensionalism
- Geography
- Global spacetime structure
- List of spacetimes
- Metric space
- Philosophy of space and time
- Present
- Time geography
