= Antigua News Room =

Antiguan online newspaper

- Website type: News and opinion website
- Available in: English
- Website: antiguanewsroom.com
- Launched: 2016; 10 years ago
- Current status: Active

Antigua News Room is an Antiguan news website. It is considered to be one of the largest news sources in the country. Founded in 2016, the owner of the website is unknown and the site has received multi-partisan condemnation for its perceived lack of transparency.

Antigua.news claims the site is owned by retired lawyer Brenton Henry. The site employs a team although articles are typically published under the name "editor". The site "aims to deliver accurate, breaking news and current affairs to the public with immediacy". Articles are published twenty-four hours a day, seven days a week. Competitor antigua.news has accused the site of plagiarism. In 2022, the site was forced to apologise due to violating a gag order in the Antigua and Barbuda High Court.

The site covers national, regional, and international subjects, including controversial ones such as the Alfa Nero dispute, the credibility crisis of the United Progressive Party, and the foreign policy of the Gaston Browne administration.
