= Scalar field solution =

Type of exact solution in general relativity of Einstein's field equations

In general relativity, a scalar field solution is an exact solution of the Einstein field equation in which the gravitational field is due entirely to the field energy and momentum of a scalar field. Such a field may or may not be massless, and it may be taken to have minimal curvature coupling, or some other choice, such as conformal coupling.

== Definition ==
In general relativity, the geometric setting for physical phenomena is a Lorentzian manifold, which is physically interpreted as a curved spacetime, and which is mathematically specified by defining a metric tensor $g_{ab}$ (or by defining a frame field). The curvature tensor $R^{a}{}_{bcd}$ of this manifold and associated quantities such as the Einstein tensor $G_{ab}$, are well-defined even in the absence of any physical theory, but in general relativity they acquire a physical interpretation as geometric manifestations of the gravitational field.

In addition, we must specify a scalar field by giving a function $\psi$. This function is required to satisfy two following conditions:

1. The function must satisfy the (curved spacetime) source-free wave equation $g^{ab} \psi_{;ab} = 0$,
2. The Einstein tensor must match the stress-energy tensor for the scalar field, which in the simplest case, a minimally coupled massless scalar field, can be written

$G_{ab}= \kappa \left( \psi_{;a} \psi_{;b} - \frac{1}{2} \psi_{;m} \psi^{;m} g_{ab} \right)$.

Both conditions follow from varying the Lagrangian density for the scalar field, which in the case of a minimally coupled massless scalar field is

$$L = -g^{mn} \, \psi_{;m} \, \psi_{;n}$$

Here,

$$\frac{\delta L}{\delta \psi} = 0$$

gives the wave equation, while

$$\frac{\delta L}{\delta g^{ab}} = 0$$

gives the Einstein equation (in the case where the field energy of the scalar field is the only source of the gravitational field).

== Physical interpretation ==
Scalar fields are often interpreted as classical approximations, in the sense of effective field theory, to some quantum field. In general relativity, the speculative quintessence field can appear as a scalar field. For example, a flux of neutral pions can in principle be modeled as a minimally coupled massless scalar field.

== Einstein tensor ==
The components of a tensor computed with respect to a frame field rather than the coordinate basis are often called physical components, because these are the components which can (in principle) be measured by an observer.

In the special case of a minimally coupled massless scalar field, an adapted frame

$$\vec{e}_0, \; \vec{e}_1, \; \vec{e}_2, \; \vec{e}_3$$

(the first is a timelike unit vector field, the last three are spacelike unit vector fields) can always be found in which the Einstein tensor takes the simple form

$$G_{\hat{a}\hat{b}} = 8 \pi \sigma \, \left[ \begin{matrix}-1&0&0&0\\0&1&0&0\\0&0&1&0\\0&0&0&1\end{matrix} \right]$$
where $\sigma$ is the energy density of the scalar field.

== Eigenvalues ==
The characteristic polynomial of the Einstein tensor in a minimally coupled massless scalar field solution must have the form

$$\chi(\lambda) = (\lambda + 8 \pi \sigma)^3 \, ( \lambda - 8 \pi \sigma )$$

In other words, we have a simple eigenvalue and a triple eigenvalue, each being the negative of the other. Multiply out and using Gröbner basis methods, we find that the following three invariants must vanish identically:

$$a_2 = 0, \; \; a_1^3 + 4 a_3 = 0, \; \; a_1^4 + 16 a_4 = 0$$

Using Newton's identities, we can rewrite these in terms of the traces of the powers. We find that

$$t_2 = t_1^2, \; t_3 = t_1^3/4, \; t_4 = t_1^4/4$$

We can rewrite this in terms of index gymnastics as the manifestly invariant criteria:

$${G^a}_a = -R$$
$${G^a}_b \, {G^b}_a = R^2$$
$${G^a}_b \, {G^b}_c \, {G^c}_a = R^3/4$$
$${G^a}_b \, {G^b}_c \, {G^c}_d \, {G^d}_a = R^4/4$$

== Examples ==
Notable individual scalar field solutions include

- the Janis–Newman–Winicour scalar field solution, which is the unique static and spherically symmetric massless minimally coupled scalar field solution.

== See also ==
- Exact solutions in general relativity
- Lorentz group
