= Observer =

An observer is one who engages in observation or in watching an experiment.

Observer may also refer to:

== Fiction ==
- Observer (novel), a 2023 science fiction novel by Robert Lanza and Nancy Kress
- Observer (video game), a cyberpunk horror video game
- Observer (Mystery Science Theater 3000), a fictional television character
- Observers, beings in the television show Fringe

== Music ==
- "Observer", a song by Gary Numan on his album The Pleasure Principle
- "The Observer", a track from The Flaming Lips' 1999 album The Soft Bulletin
- The Observers, an alternative name for reggae session band Soul Syndicate

== Publications ==
- Observer, online successor to The New York Observer
- The Observer, a UK Sunday newspaper & magazine
- The Observer (disambiguation), multiple publications including newspapers, magazines & fiction
- The APS Observer, a member magazine of the Association for Psychological Science (APS)

== Science and technology ==
- Observer (general relativity)
- Observer (quantum physics)
- Observer (special relativity)
- Observer (meteorological)
- Observer pattern, a design pattern used in computer programming
- State observer in control theory, a system that models a real system in order to provide an estimate of its internal state

== Other uses ==
- Observer status in an organization
- The Observer type in the Enneagram of Personality model
- Air observer, an aircrew member whose duties are predominantly reconnaissance, commonly used in the World War I era
- Donald Alaster Macdonald (1859–1932), Australian journalist who wrote under the pseudonym 'Observer'

== See also ==
- Observer effect (disambiguation)
- National Observer (disambiguation), a variety of publications
- The Observer (disambiguation)
- United Nations Military Observer
