= List of spacetimes =

This is a list of well-known spacetimes in general relativity. Where the metric tensor is given, a particular choice of coordinates is used, but there are often other useful choices of coordinate available.

In general relativity, spacetime is described mathematically by a metric tensor (on a smooth manifold), conventionally denoted $g$ or $ds^2$. This metric is sufficient to formulate the vacuum Einstein field equations. If matter is included, described by a stress-energy tensor, then one has the Einstein field equations with matter.

On certain regions of spacetime (and possibly the entire spacetime) one can describe the points by a set of coordinates. In this case, the metric can be written down in terms of the coordinates, or more precisely, the coordinate one-forms and coordinates.

During the course of the development of the field of general relativity, a number of explicit metrics have been found which satisfy the Einstein field equations, a number of which are collected here. These model various phenomena in general relativity, such as possibly charged or rotating black holes and cosmological models of the universe. On the other hand, some of the spacetimes are more for academic or pedagogical interest rather than modelling physical phenomena.

== Maximally symmetric spacetimes ==
These are spacetimes which admit the maximum number of isometries or Killing vector fields for a given dimension, and each of these can be formulated in an arbitrary number of dimensions.

- Minkowski spacetime

$$g = -dt^2 + \sum_{i = 1}^{n-1} dx_i^2$$

- de-Sitter spacetime

$$g = -dt^2 + \alpha^2 \sinh^2\left(\frac{1}{\alpha}t\right) dH_{n-1}^2,$$
where $\alpha$ is real and $dH_{n-1}^2$ is the standard hyperbolic metric.

- Anti de-Sitter spacetime

$$g =\frac{1}{y^2}\left(-dt^2+dy^2+\sum_{i=1}^{n-2}dx_i^2\right)$$

== Black hole spacetimes ==
These spacetimes model black holes. The Schwarzschild and Reissner–Nordstrom black holes are spherically symmetric, while Schwarzschild and Kerr are electrically neutral.

- Schwarzschild spacetime

$$g = -\left(1 - \frac{2M}{r} \right) dt^2 + \left(1-\frac{2M}{r}\right)^{-1} dr^2 + r^2 d\Omega^2,$$
where $d\Omega^2 = d\theta^2 + \sin^2\theta d\phi^2$ is the round metric on the sphere, and $M$ is a positive, real parameter.

- Kruskal spacetime (Maximally extended Schwarzschild spacetime)

$$g = - \frac{ 32 M^3 e^{-r(U,V)/2M} }{r(U,V)} dU dV + r(U,V)^2 d\Omega^2,$$
where $r(U,V)$ is defined implicitly.

- Reissner–Nordstrom spacetime

$$g = -\left(1 - \frac{2M}{r} + \frac{e^2}{r^2}\right) dt^2 + \left(1-\frac{2M}{r} + \frac{e^2}{r^2}\right)^{-1} dr^2 + r^2 d\Omega^2$$

- Kerr spacetime
- Kerr–Newman spacetime

$$g = -\frac{\Delta}{\rho^2}\left(dt - a \sin^2\theta \,d\phi \right)^2 +\frac{\sin^2\theta}{\rho^2}\Big(\left(r^2+a^2\right)\,d\phi - a \,dt\Big)^2 + \frac{\rho^2}{\Delta}dr^2 + \rho^2 \,d\theta^2.$$
See Boyer–Lindquist coordinates for details on the terms appearing in this formula.

== Cosmological spacetimes ==
- FLRW spacetime

$$g = - dt^2 + a(t)^2 \left(\frac{dr^2}{1 - kr^2} + r^2 d\Omega^2\right)$$
, where $k$ is often restricted to take values in the set $-1, 0, 1$.

- Lemaître–Tolman spacetime

== Gravitational wave spacetimes ==
- pp-wave spacetime

== Other ==
- Spherically symmetric spacetime
- Asymptotically flat spacetime
- Non-relativistic spacetime
- Static spacetime
- Einstein static universe spacetime
- Alcubierre spacetime
- Ellis wormhole spacetime
- Gödel spacetime
- Taub–NUT spacetime
- Kasner spacetime
- Mixmaster spacetime
- Vaidya spacetime
- Tolman–Oppenheimer–Volkoff spacetime
- Oppenheimer–Snyder spacetime

== See also ==
- Spacetime symmetries
- Quantum spacetime

== Sources ==
- General Relativity, R. Wald, The University of Chicago Press, 1984, ISBN 0-226-87033-2
- Spacetime and Geometry, S. Carroll, Cambridge University Press, 2019, ISBN 9781108488396
