= List of newspapers in Antigua and Barbuda =

At the beginning of 2020, Antigua Observer was the only newspaper in Antigua and Barbuda. Founded in 1993, it originally published via fax and was a daily newspaper, available from Monday to Saturday. Since 2018, it has been published exclusively online. It is owned by NewsCo Limited, based in St. John's, Antigua.

Antigua.news is a digital news portal founded in 2022 as the official news channel of the Embassy of Antigua and Barbuda in Madrid, focused on covering current affairs in Antigua and Barbuda, as well as key global news stories.

Antigua News Room is a popular news website established in 2016.

A recent addition to the Antiguan news landscape is the Antiguan Herald, a non-political international publication that claims to be the #1 Source for Trusted news and Information. It is the country's self-described newspaper of record. The Pointe Broadcasting Network also operates an online newspaper known as the Pointe Express.

== Historic newspapers ==
- The Antigua Free Press, published by Benjamin Mekom (Benjamin Franklin's nephew)
- The Weekly Register, founded in 1814 by Henry Loving, ceased in 1839
- Herald Gazette, founded in 1831
- Antigua Almanac and Register, founded in 1843
- Antigua Observer, founded in 1843
- Antigua Times, founded in 1851 by an American, Fred S. Jewett, ceased in 1878
- Antigua Standard, founded in 1874, changed to Antigua Sun in 1909, ceased in 1922
- The Magnet, founded in 1931
- The Progress, founded in 1940
- The Antigua Star, founded in 1940
- The Worker's Voice, founded in 1944 by the Antigua Trades and Labour Union, ceased in the 1990s
- The Anvil, founded in 1956
- The Antigua Times, founded in the late 1960s
- Antigua Yearbook, founded in 1964
- The Outlet, founded in 1968, associated with the Antigua Caribbean Liberation Movement, ceased in the 1990s
- The Trumpet, founded in about 1968
- The Sentinel, late 1980s/1990s, founded by Vere Bird Jr.
- News Pages Antigua, founded in the 2000s
- Carib Arena, founded in the 2000s, short-lived
- Antigua Sun and Sun Weekend, founded in 1997 by Allen Stanford
- Caribbean Times, in Antigua and Barbuda, ceased to publish in January 2018. (There is a newspaper also called Caribbean Times that is published in New York City.)
