= Observer (special relativity) =

Frame of reference in special relativity

In special relativity, an observer is a frame of reference from which a set of objects or events are being measured. Usually this is an inertial observer or inertial reference frame. When the frame is attached to an object it is said to be a comoving frame. Less often an observer may be an arbitrary non-inertial reference frame such as a Rindler frame which may be called an accelerating observer.

The special relativity usage differs significantly from the ordinary English meaning of "observer". Reference frames are inherently nonlocal constructs, covering all of space and time or a nontrivial part of it; thus it does not make sense to speak of an observer (in the special relativistic sense) having a location. Also, an inertial observer cannot accelerate at a later time, nor can an accelerating observer stop accelerating.

Physicists use the term "observer" as shorthand for a specific reference frame from which a set of objects or events is being measured. Speaking of an observer in special relativity is not specifically hypothesizing an individual person who is experiencing events, but rather it is a particular mathematical context which objects and events are to be evaluated from. The effects of special relativity occur whether or not there is a sentient being within the inertial reference frame to witness them.

== History ==
Einstein made frequent use of the word "observer" (Beobachter) in his original 1905 paper on special relativity and in his early popular exposition of the subject. However he used the term in its vernacular sense, referring for example to "the man at the railway-carriage window" or "observers who take the railway train as their reference-body" or "an observer inside who is equipped with apparatus". Here the reference body or coordinate system—a physical arrangement of metersticks and clocks which covers the region of spacetime where the events take place—is distinguished from the observer—an experimenter who assigns spacetime coordinates to events far from himself by observing (literally seeing) coincidences between those events and local features of the reference body.

This distinction between observer and the observer's "apparatus" like coordinate systems, measurement tools etc. was dropped by many later writers, and today it is common to find the term "observer" used to imply an observer's associated coordinate system (usually assumed to be a coordinate lattice constructed from an orthonormal right-handed set of spacelike vectors perpendicular to a timelike vector (a frame field), see Doran). Where Einstein referred to "an observer who takes the train as his reference body" or "an observer located at the origin of the coordinate system", this group of modern writers says, for example, "an observer is represented by a coordinate system in the four variables of space and time" or "the observer in frame S finds that a certain event A occurs at the origin of his coordinate system". However, there is no unanimity on this point, with a number of authors continuing a preference for distinguishing between observer (as a concept related to state of motion) from the more abstract general mathematical notion of coordinate system (which can be, but need not be, related to motion). This approach places more emphasis on the many choices for description open to an observer. The observer is then identified with an observational reference frame, rather than with the combination of coordinate system, measurement apparatus and state of motion.

It also has been suggested that the term "observer" is antiquated, and should be replaced by an observer team (or family of observers) in which each observer makes observations in their immediate vicinity, where delays are negligible, cooperating with the rest of the team to set up synchronized clocks across the entire region of observation, and all team members sending their various results back to a data collector for synthesis.

== "Observer" as a form of relative coordinates ==
Relative direction is a concept found in many human languages. In English, a description of the spatial location of an object may use terms such as "left" and "right" which are relative to the speaker or relative to a particular object or perspective (e.g. "to your left, as you are facing the front door").

The degree to which such a description is subjective is rather subtle. See the Ozma Problem for an illustration of this.

Some impersonal examples of relative direction in language are the nautical terms bow, aft, port, and starboard. These are relative, egocentric-type spatial terms but they do not involve an ego: there is a bow, an aft, a port, and a starboard to a ship even when no one is aboard.

Special relativity statements involving an "observer" are in some measure articulating a similar kind of impersonal relative direction. An "observer" is a perspective in that it is a context from which events in other inertial reference frames are evaluated but it is not the sort of perspective that a single particular person would have: it is not localized and it is not associated with a particular point in space, but rather with an entire inertial reference frame that may exist anywhere in the universe (given certain lengthy mathematical specifications and caveats).

== Usage in other scientific disciplines ==
The term observer also has special meaning in other areas of science, such as quantum mechanics, and information theory. See for example, Schrödinger's cat and Maxwell's demon.

In general relativity the term "observer" refers more commonly to a person (or a machine) making passive local measurements, a usage much closer to the ordinary English meaning of the word. In quantum mechanics, "observation" is synonymous with quantum measurement and "observer" with a measurement apparatus and observable with what can be measured. This conflict of usages within physics is sometimes a source of confusion.

== See also ==
- Frame of reference
- Minkowski diagram
- Observer (disambiguation)
