= National Observer =

National Observer may refer to:

- National Observer (United States), a discontinued newspaper which ran from 1962 to 1977
- National Observer (Australia), a quarterly political magazine which ran from 1988 to 2012
- National Observer (UK), a journal published in the 19th century
- National Observer (Canada), an online news publication focusing on energy, environment and federal politics
