= Lanczos tensor =

Rank-3 tensor in general relativity associated with gauge fields

The Lanczos tensor or Lanczos potential is a rank 3 tensor in general relativity that generates the Weyl tensor. It was first introduced by Cornelius Lanczos in 1949. The theoretical importance of the Lanczos tensor is that it serves as the gauge field for the gravitational field in the same way that, by analogy, the electromagnetic four-potential generates the electromagnetic field.

== Definition ==
The Lanczos tensor can be defined in a few different ways. The most common modern definition is through the Weyl–Lanczos equations, which demonstrate the generation of the Weyl tensor from the Lanczos tensor. These equations, presented below, were given by Takeno in 1964. The way that Lanczos introduced the tensor originally was as a Lagrange multiplier on constraint terms studied in the variational approach to general relativity. Under any definition, the Lanczos tensor H exhibits the following symmetries:

$$H_{abc}+H_{bac}=0,\,$$
$$H_{abc}+H_{bca}+H_{cab}=0.$$

The Lanczos tensor always exists in four dimensions but does not generalize to higher dimensions. This highlights the specialness of four dimensions. Note further that the full Riemann tensor cannot in general be derived from derivatives of the Lanczos potential alone. The Einstein field equations must provide the Ricci tensor to complete the components of the Ricci decomposition.

The Curtright field has a gauge-transformation dynamics similar to that of Lanczos tensor. But Curtright field exists in arbitrary dimensions > 4D.

=== Weyl–Lanczos equations ===
The Weyl–Lanczos equations express the Weyl tensor entirely as derivatives of the Lanczos tensor:

$$\begin{align}C_{abcd}&=
H_{abc;d}+H_{cda;b}+H_{bad;c}+H_{dcb;a}
+ (H^e{}_{(ac);e} + H_{(a|e|}{}^e{}_{;c)})g_{bd}
+ (H^e{}_{(bd);e} + H_{(b|e|}{}^e{}_{;d)})g_{ac} \\
&\quad - (H^e{}_{(ad);e} + H_{(a|e|}{}^e{}_{;d)})g_{bc}
- (H^e{}_{(bc);e} + H_{(b|e|}{}^e{}_{;c)})g_{ad}
-\frac{2}{3} H^{ef}{}_{f;e}(g_{ac}g_{bd}-g_{ad}g_{bc})
\end{align}$$

where $C_{abcd}$ is the Weyl tensor, the semicolon denotes the covariant derivative, and the subscripted parentheses indicate symmetrization. Although the above equations can be used to define the Lanczos tensor, they also show that it is not unique but rather has gauge freedom under an affine group. If $\Phi^a$ is an arbitrary vector field, then the Weyl–Lanczos equations are invariant under the gauge transformation

$$H'_{abc} = H_{abc}+\Phi_{[a} g_{b]c}$$

where the subscripted brackets indicate antisymmetrization. An often convenient choice is the Lanczos algebraic gauge, $\Phi_a=-\frac{2}{3}H_{ab}{}^b,$ which sets $H'_{ab}{}^b=0.$ The gauge can be further restricted through the Lanczos differential gauge $H_{ab}{}^c{}_{;c}=0$. These gauge choices reduce the Weyl–Lanczos equations to the simpler form

$$C_{abcd}=H_{abc;d}+H_{cda;b}+H_{bad;c}+H_{dcb;a}
+H^e{}_{ac;e}g_{bd}+H^e{}_{bd;e}g_{ac}-H^e{}_{ad;e}g_{bc}-H^e{}_{bc;e}g_{ad}.$$

== Wave equation ==
The Lanczos potential tensor satisfies a wave equation

$$\begin{align}\Box H_{abc} = & \; J_{abc}\\
& {}- 2{R_c}^d H_{abd}+{R_a}^d H_{bcd}+{R_b}^d H_{acd}\\
& {}+ \left( H_{dbe}g_{ac}-H_{dae}g_{bc} \right)R^{de}+\frac{1}{2}RH_{abc},\end{align}$$

where $\Box$ is the d'Alembert operator and

$$J_{abc} = R_{ca;b}-R_{cb;a}-\frac{1}{6}\left( g_{ca}R_{;b}-g_{cb}R_{;a} \right)$$

is known as the Cotton tensor. Since the Cotton tensor depends only on covariant derivatives of the Ricci tensor, it can perhaps be interpreted as a kind of matter current. The additional self-coupling terms have no direct electromagnetic equivalent. These self-coupling terms, however, do not affect the vacuum solutions, where the Ricci tensor vanishes and the curvature is described entirely by the Weyl tensor. Thus in vacuum, the Einstein field equations are equivalent to the homogeneous wave equation $\Box H_{abc} = 0,$ in perfect analogy to the vacuum wave equation $\Box A_{a} = 0$ of the electromagnetic four-potential. This shows a formal similarity between gravitational waves and electromagnetic waves, with the Lanczos tensor well-suited for studying gravitational waves.

In the weak field approximation where $g_{ab}=\eta_{ab}+h_{ab}$, a convenient form for the Lanczos tensor in the Lanczos gauge is

$$4H_{abc} \approx h_{ac,b}-h_{bc,a}-\frac{1}{6}(\eta_{ac}{h^d}_{d,b}-\eta_{bc}{h^d}_{d,a}) .$$

== Example ==
The most basic nontrivial case for expressing the Lanczos tensor is, of course, for the Schwarzschild metric. The simplest, explicit component representation in natural units for the Lanczos tensor in this case is

$$H_{trt}=\frac{GM}{r^2}$$

with all other components vanishing up to symmetries. This form, however, is not in the Lanczos gauge. The nonvanishing terms of the Lanczos tensor in the Lanczos gauge are

$$H_{trt}=\frac{2GM}{3r^2}$$
$$H_{r\theta\theta}=\frac{-GM}{3(1-2GM/r)}$$
$$H_{r\phi\phi}=\frac{-GM\sin^2 \theta}{3(1-2GM/r)}$$

It is further possible to show, even in this simple case, that the Lanczos tensor cannot in general be reduced to a linear combination of the spin coefficients of the Newman–Penrose formalism, which attests to the Lanczos tensor's fundamental nature. Similar calculations have been used to construct arbitrary Petrov type D solutions.

== See also ==
- Bach tensor
- Bel–Robinson tensor
- Schouten tensor
- Ricci calculus
- tetradic Palatini action
- Self-dual Palatini action
