= Ricci decomposition =

In the mathematical fields of Riemannian and pseudo-Riemannian geometry, the Ricci decomposition is a way of breaking up the Riemann curvature tensor of a Riemannian or pseudo-Riemannian manifold into pieces with special algebraic properties. This decomposition is of fundamental importance in Riemannian and pseudo-Riemannian geometry.

== Definition of the decomposition ==
Let (M,g) be a Riemannian or pseudo-Riemannian n-manifold. Consider its Riemann curvature, as a (0,4)-tensor field. This article will follow the sign convention

$$R_{ijkl}=g_{lp}\Big(\partial_i\Gamma_{jk}^p-\partial_j\Gamma_{ik}^p+\Gamma_{iq}^p\Gamma_{jk}^q-\Gamma_{jq}^p\Gamma_{ik}^q\Big);$$

written multilinearly, this is the convention

$$\operatorname{Rm}(W,X,Y,Z)=g\Big(\nabla_W\nabla_XY-\nabla_X\nabla_WY-\nabla_{[W,X]}Y,Z\Big).$$

With this convention, the Ricci tensor is a (0,2)-tensor field defined by R_{jk}=g^{il}R_{ijkl} and the scalar curvature is defined by R=g^{jk}R_{jk}. (Note that this is the less common sign convention for the Ricci tensor; it is more standard to define it by contracting either the first and third or the second and fourth indices, which yields a Ricci tensor with the opposite sign. Under that more common convention, the signs of the Ricci tensor and scalar must be changed in the equations below.) Define the traceless Ricci tensor

$$Z_{jk}=R_{jk}-\frac{1}{n}Rg_{jk},$$

and then define three (0,4)-tensor fields S, E, and W by

$$\begin{align}
S_{ijkl}&=\frac{R}{n(n-1)}\big(g_{il}g_{jk}-g_{ik}g_{jl}\big)\\
E_{ijkl}&=\frac{1}{n-2}\big(Z_{il}g_{jk}-Z_{jl}g_{ik}-Z_{ik}g_{jl}+Z_{jk}g_{il}\big)\\
W_{ijkl}&=R_{ijkl}-S_{ijkl}-E_{ijkl}.
\end{align}$$

The "Ricci decomposition" is the statement

$$R_{ijkl}=S_{ijkl}+E_{ijkl}+W_{ijkl}.$$

As stated, this is vacuous since it is just a reorganization of the definition of W. The importance of the decomposition is in the properties of the three new tensors S, E, and W.

Terminological note. The tensor W is called the Weyl tensor. The notation W is standard in mathematics literature, while C is more common in physics literature. The notation R is standard in both, while there is no standardized notation for S, Z, and E.

== Basic properties ==
=== Properties of the pieces ===
Each of the tensors S, E, and W has the same algebraic symmetries as the Riemann tensor. That is:

$$\begin{align}
S_{ijkl}&=-S_{jikl}=-S_{ijlk}=S_{klij}\\
E_{ijkl}&=-E_{jikl}=-E_{ijlk}=E_{klij}\\
W_{ijkl}&=-W_{jikl}=-W_{ijlk}=W_{klij}
\end{align}$$

together with

$$\begin{align}
S_{ijkl}+S_{jkil}+S_{kijl}&=0\\
E_{ijkl}+E_{jkil}+E_{kijl}&=0\\
W_{ijkl}+W_{jkil}+W_{kijl}&=0.
\end{align}$$

The Weyl tensor has the additional symmetry that it is completely traceless:

$$g^{il}W_{ijkl}=0.$$

Hermann Weyl showed that in dimension at least four, W has the remarkable property of measuring the deviation of a Riemannian or pseudo-Riemannian manifold from local conformal flatness; if it is zero, then M can be covered by charts relative to which g has the form g_{ij}=e^{f}δ_{ij} for some function f defined chart by chart.

(In fewer than three dimensions, every manifold is locally conformally flat, whereas in three dimensions, the Cotton tensor measures deviation from local conformal flatness.)

=== Properties of the decomposition ===
One may check that the Ricci decomposition is orthogonal in the sense that

$$S_{ijkl}E^{ijkl}=S_{ijkl}W^{ijkl}=E_{ijkl}W^{ijkl}=0,$$

recalling the general definition $T^{ijkl}=g^{ip}g^{jq}g^{kr}g^{ls}T_{pqrs}.$ This has the consequence, which could be proved directly, that

$$R_{ijkl}R^{ijkl}=S_{ijkl}S^{ijkl}+E_{ijkl}E^{ijkl}+W_{ijkl}W^{ijkl}.$$

This orthogonality can be represented without indices by

$$\langle S,E\rangle_g=\langle S,W\rangle_g=\langle E,W\rangle_g=0,$$

together with

$$|\operatorname{Rm}|_g^2=|S|_g^2+|E|_g^2+|W|_g^2.$$

== Related formulas ==
One can compute the "norm formulas"

$$\begin{align}
S_{ijkl}S^{ijkl}&=\frac{2R^2}{n(n-1)}\\
E_{ijkl}E^{ijkl}&=\frac{4R_{ij}R^{ij}}{n-2}-\frac{4R^2}{n(n-2)}\\
W_{ijkl}W^{ijkl}&=R_{ijkl}R^{ijkl}-\frac{4R_{ij}R^{ij}}{n-2}+\frac{2R^2}{(n-1)(n-2)}
\end{align}$$

and the "trace formulas"

$$\begin{align}
g^{il}S_{ijkl}&=\frac{1}{n}Rg_{jk}\\
g^{il}E_{ijkl}&=R_{jk}-\frac{1}{n}Rg_{jk}\\
g^{il}W_{ijkl}&=0.
\end{align}$$

== Mathematical explanation ==
Mathematically, the Ricci decomposition is the decomposition of the space of all tensors having the symmetries of the Riemann tensor into its irreducible representations for the action of the orthogonal group (Besse 1987, Chapter 1, §G). Let V be an n-dimensional vector space, equipped with a metric tensor (of possibly mixed signature). Here V is modeled on the cotangent space at a point, so that a curvature tensor R (with all indices lowered) is an element of the tensor product V⊗V⊗V⊗V. The curvature tensor is skew symmetric in its first and last two entries:

$$R(x,y,z,w)=-R(y,x,z,w)=-R(x,y,w,z)\,$$

and obeys the interchange symmetry

$$R(x,y,z,w) = R(z,w,x,y),\,$$

for all x,y,z,w ∈ V^{∗}. As a result, R is an element of the subspace $S^2\Lambda^2 V$, the second symmetric power of the second exterior power of V. A curvature tensor must also satisfy the Bianchi identity, meaning that it is in the kernel of the linear map $b: S^2\Lambda^2 V \to \Lambda^4 V$ given by

$$b(R)(x,y,z,w) = R(x,y,z,w) + R(y,z,x,w) + R(z,x,y,w).\,$$

The space RV = ker b in S^{2}Λ^{2}V is the space of algebraic curvature tensors. The Ricci decomposition is the decomposition of this space into irreducible factors. The Ricci contraction mapping

$$c : S^2\Lambda^2 V \to S^2V$$

is given by

$$c(R)(x,y) = \operatorname{tr}R(x,\cdot,y,\cdot).$$

This associates a symmetric 2-form to an algebraic curvature tensor. Conversely, given a pair of symmetric 2-forms h and k, the Kulkarni–Nomizu product of h and k

$$(h {~\wedge\!\!\!\!\!\!\!\!\;\bigcirc~} k)(x,y,z,w) = h(x,z)k(y,w)+h(y,w)k(x,z) -h(x,w)k(y,z)-h(y,z)k(x,w)$$

produces an algebraic curvature tensor.

If n ≥ 4, then there is an orthogonal decomposition into (unique) irreducible subspaces

RV = SV ⊕ EV ⊕ CV

where

$\mathbf{S}V = \mathbb{R} g {~\wedge\!\!\!\!\!\!\!\!\;\bigcirc~} g$, where $\mathbb{R}$ is the space of real scalars
$\mathbf{E}V = g {~\wedge\!\!\!\!\!\!\!\!\;\bigcirc~} S^2_0V$, where S^{2}_{0}V is the space of trace-free symmetric 2-forms
$$\mathbf{C}V = \ker c \cap \ker b.$$

The parts S, E, and C of the Ricci decomposition of a given Riemann tensor R are the orthogonal projections of R onto these invariant factors, and correspond (respectively) to the Ricci scalar, the trace-removed Ricci tensor, and the Weyl tensor of the Riemann curvature tensor. In particular,

$$R = S + E + C$$

is an orthogonal decomposition in the sense that

$$|R|^2 = |S|^2 + |E|^2 + |C|^2.$$

This decomposition expresses the space of tensors with Riemann symmetries as a direct sum of the scalar submodule, the Ricci submodule, and Weyl submodule, respectively. Each of these modules is an irreducible representation for the orthogonal group (Singer & Thorpe 1969), and thus the Ricci decomposition is a special case of the splitting of a module for a semisimple Lie group into its irreducible factors. In dimension 4, the Weyl module decomposes further into a pair of irreducible factors for the special orthogonal group: the self-dual and antiself-dual parts W^{+} and W^{−}.

== Physical interpretation ==
The Ricci decomposition can be interpreted physically in Einstein's theory of general relativity, where it is sometimes called the Géhéniau-Debever decomposition. In this theory, the Einstein field equation

$$G_{ab} = 8 \pi \, T_{ab}$$

where $T_{ab}$ is the stress–energy tensor describing the amount and motion of all matter and all nongravitational field energy and momentum, states that the Ricci tensor—or equivalently, the Einstein tensor—represents that part of the gravitational field which is due to the immediate presence of nongravitational energy and momentum. The Weyl tensor represents the part of the gravitational field which can propagate as a gravitational wave through a region containing no matter or nongravitational fields. Regions of spacetime in which the Weyl tensor vanishes contain no gravitational radiation and are also conformally flat.

== See also ==
- Bel decomposition of the Riemann tensor
- Scalar–vector–tensor decomposition
- Conformal geometry
- Petrov classification
- Plebanski tensor
- Ricci calculus
- Schouten tensor
- Trace-free Ricci tensor
