= Local twistor =

Vector bundle associated with conformal manifolds

In differential geometry, the local twistor bundle is a specific vector bundle with connection that can be associated to any conformal manifold, at least locally. Intuitively, a local twistor is an association of a twistor space to each point of space-time, together with a conformally invariant connection that relates the twistor spaces at different points. This connection can have holonomy that obstructs the existence of "global" twistors (that is, solutions of the twistor equation in open sets).

== Construction ==
Let M be a pseudo-Riemannian conformal manifold with a spin structure and a conformal metric of signature (p,q). The conformal group is the pseudo-orthogonal group $SO(p+1,q+1)$. There is a conformal Cartan connection on a bundle, the tractor bundle, of M. The spin group of $SO(p+1,q+1)$ admits a fundamental representation, the spin representation, and the associated bundle is the local twistor bundle.

== Representation via Weyl spinors ==
Local twistors can be represented as pairs of Weyl spinors on M (in general from different spin representations, determined by the reality conditions specific to the signature). In the case of a four-dimensional Lorentzian manifold, such as the space-time of general relativity, a local twistor has the form

$$Z^\alpha = \begin{bmatrix}\omega^A\\\pi_{A'}\end{bmatrix}.$$

Here we use index conventions from Penrose & Rindler (1986), and $\omega^A$ and $\pi_{A'}$ are two-component complex spinors for the Lorentz group $SL(2,\mathbb C)$.

== Local twistor transport ==
The connection, sometimes called local twistor transport, is given by

$$dZ^\alpha = \begin{bmatrix}d\omega^A - i\theta^{AA'}\pi_{A'}\\ d\pi_{A'}-iP_{AA'}\omega^A\end{bmatrix}.$$

Here $\theta^{AA'}$ is the canonical one-form and $P_{AA'}$ the Schouten tensor, contracted on one index with the canonical one-form. An analogous equation holds in other dimensions, with appropriate Clifford algebra multipliers between the two Weyl spin representations (Sparling 1986). In this formalism, the twistor equation is the requirement that a local twistor be parallel under the connection.

== Canonical filtration ==
In general, the local twistor bundle T is equipped with a short exact sequence of vector bundles

$$0\to \Pi\to T\to \Omega\to 0$$

where $\Pi$ and $\Omega$ are two Weyl spin bundles. The bundle $\Pi$ is a distinguished sub-bundle, that corresponds to the marked point of contact of the conformal Cartan connection. That is, there is a canonical marked one-dimensional subspace X in the tractor bundle, and $\Pi$ is the annihilator of X under Clifford multipliction. In four dimensions, $\Pi$ is the space of spinors $\pi_{A'}$ and $\Omega$ the space of $\omega^A$. Under the Plücker embedding, the tractor bundle in four dimensions is isomorphic to the exterior square of the local twistor bundle, and $\Pi$ consists of all the twistors incident with

$$X^{\alpha\beta}=\begin{bmatrix}0&0\\ 0&\epsilon_{A'B'}\end{bmatrix}$$

where $\epsilon_{A'B'}$ is the symplectic form on $\Pi$.

== Curvature ==
The curvature of the local twistor connection involves both the Weyl curvature and the Cotton tensor. (It is the Cartan conformal curvature.) The curvature preserves the space $\Pi$, and on $\Pi$ it involves only the conformally-invariant Weyl curvature.
