= Weyl–Schouten theorem =

Theorem in differential geometry

In the mathematical field of differential geometry, the existence of isothermal coordinates for a (pseudo-)Riemannian metric is often of interest. In the case of a metric on a two-dimensional space, the existence of isothermal coordinates is unconditional. For higher-dimensional spaces, the Weyl–Schouten theorem (named after Hermann Weyl and Jan Arnoldus Schouten) characterizes the existence of isothermal coordinates by certain equations to be satisfied by the Riemann curvature tensor of the metric.

Existence of isothermal coordinates is also called conformal flatness, although some authors refer to it instead as local conformal flatness; for those authors, conformal flatness refers to a more restrictive condition.

== Theorem ==
In terms of the Riemann curvature tensor, the Ricci tensor, and the scalar curvature, the Weyl tensor of a pseudo-Riemannian metric g of dimension n is given by

$$W_{ijkl}=R_{ijkl}-\frac{R_{ik}g_{jl}-R_{il}g_{jk}+R_{jl}g_{ik}-R_{jk}g_{il}}{n-2}+\frac{R}{(n-1)(n-2)}(g_{jl}g_{ik}-g_{jk}g_{ik}).$$

The Schouten tensor is defined via the Ricci and scalar curvatures by

$$S_{ij}=\frac{2}{n-2}R_{ij}-\frac{Rg_{ij}}{(n-2)(n-1)}.$$

As can be calculated by the Bianchi identities, these satisfy the relation that

$$\nabla^jW_{ijkl}=\frac{n-3}{2}(\nabla_kS_{il}-\nabla_lS_{ik}).$$

The Weyl–Schouten theorem says that for any pseudo-Riemannian manifold of dimension n:

- If n ≥ 4 then the manifold is conformally flat if and only if its Weyl tensor is zero.
- If n = 3 then the manifold is conformally flat if and only if its Schouten tensor is a Codazzi tensor.

As known prior to the work of Weyl and Schouten, in the case n = 2, every manifold is conformally flat. In all cases, the theorem and its proof are entirely local, so the topology of the manifold is irrelevant.

There are varying conventions for the meaning of conformal flatness; the meaning as taken here is sometimes instead called local conformal flatness.

== Sketch of proof ==
The only if direction is a direct computation based on how the Weyl and Schouten tensors are modified by a conformal change of metric. The if direction requires more work.

Consider the following equation for a 1-form ω:

$$\nabla_i\omega_j=\frac{1}{2}\omega_i\omega_j-\frac{1}{4}g^{pq}\omega_p\omega_qg_{ij}-S_{ij}$$

Let F^{ω,g} denote the tensor on the right-hand side. The Frobenius theorem states that the above equation is locally solvable if and only if

$$\partial_k\Gamma_{ij}^p\omega_p+\Gamma_{ij}^pF_{kp}^{\omega,g}+\frac{1}{2}F_{ki}^{\omega,g}\omega_j+\frac{1}{2}\omega_iF_{kj}^{\omega,g}-\frac{1}{4}\partial_kg^{pq}\omega_p\omega_qg_{ij}-\frac{1}{2}g^{pq}\omega_pF_{kq}^{\omega,g}g_{ij}-\frac{1}{4}g^{pq}\omega_p\omega_q\partial_kg_{ij}-\partial_kS_{ij}$$

is symmetric in i and k for any 1-form ω. A direct cancellation of terms shows that this is the case if and only if

$${W_{kij}}^p\omega_p=\nabla_kS_{ij}-\nabla_iS_{jk}$$

for any 1-form ω. If n = 3 then the left-hand side is zero since the Weyl tensor of any three-dimensional metric is zero; the right-hand side is zero whenever the Schouten tensor is a Codazzi tensor. If n ≥ 4 then the left-hand side is zero whenever the Weyl tensor is zero; the right-hand side is also then zero due to the identity given above which relates the Weyl tensor to the Schouten tensor.

As such, under the given curvature and dimension conditions, there always exists a locally defined 1-form ω solving the given equation. From the symmetry of the right-hand side, it follows that ω must be a closed form. The Poincaré lemma then implies that there is a real-valued function u with ω = du. Due to the formula for the Ricci curvature under a conformal change of metric, the (locally defined) pseudo-Riemannian metric e^{u}g is Ricci-flat. If n = 3 then every Ricci-flat metric is flat, and if n ≥ 4 then every Ricci-flat and Weyl-flat metric is flat.

== See also ==
- Yamabe problem
- Cotton tensor
