= Polar representation =

In mathematics, polar representation may refer to:

- Representations of points in the Euclidean plane via the polar coordinate system
- Polar actions on Euclidean spaces
