= Tractor bundle =

In conformal geometry, the tractor bundle is a particular vector bundle constructed on a conformal manifold whose fibres form an effective representation of the conformal group (see associated bundle).

The term tractor is a portmanteau of "Tracy Thomas" and "twistor", the bundle having been introduced first by T. Y. Thomas as an alternative formulation of the Cartan conformal connection, and later rediscovered within the formalism of local twistors and generalized to projective connections by Michael Eastwood et al. in Tractor bundles can be defined for arbitrary parabolic geometries.

== Conformal manifolds ==
The tractor bundle for a $n$-dimensional conformal manifold $M$ of signature $(p,q)$ is a rank $n+2$ vector bundle $\mathcal T\to M$ equipped with the following data:

- a metric $G:\mathcal T\otimes\mathcal T\to\mathbb R$, of signature $(p+1,q+1)$,
- a line subbundle $\mathcal X\subset\mathcal T$,
- a linear connection $\nabla$, preserving the metric $G$, and satisfying the nondegeneracy property that, for any local non-vanishing section $X$ of the bundle $\mathcal X$,

$$v\mapsto \nabla_vX\pmod{\mathcal X}$$
is a linear isomorphism at each point from the tangent bundle of $M$ ($v\in TM$) to the quotient bundle $\mathcal X^\perp/\mathcal X$, where $\mathcal X^\perp$ denotes the orthogonal complement of $\mathcal X$ in $\mathcal T$ relative to the metric $G$.

Given a tractor bundle, the metrics in the conformal class are given by fixing a local section $X$ of $\mathcal X$, and defining for $v,w\in TM$,
$$g_X(v,w) = G(\nabla_vX,\nabla_wX).$$

To go the other way, and construct a tractor bundle from a conformal structure, requires more work. The tractor bundle is then an associated bundle of the Cartan geometry determined by the conformal structure. The conformal group for a manifold of signature $(p,q)$ is $SO(p+1,q+1)$, and one obtains the tractor bundle (with connection) as the connection induced by the Cartan conformal connection on the bundle associated to the standard representation of the conformal group. Because the fibre of the Cartan conformal bundle is the stabilizer of a null ray, this singles out the line bundle $\mathcal X$.

More explicitly, suppose that $g$ is a metric on $M$, with Levi-Civita connection $\nabla$. The tractor bundle is the space of 2-jets of solutions $\sigma$ to the eigenvalue equation
$$(\nabla_i\nabla_j + P_{ij})\sigma = \lambda g_{ij}$$
where $P_{ij}$ is the Schouten tensor. A little work then shows that the sections of the tractor bundle (in a fixed Weyl gauge) can be represented by $(n+2)$-vectors
$$U^I=\begin{bmatrix}\sigma\\ \mu^i\\ \rho\end{bmatrix}.$$
The connection is
$$\nabla_jU^I=\nabla_j\begin{bmatrix}\sigma\\ \mu^i\\ \rho\end{bmatrix}=\begin{bmatrix}\nabla_j\sigma-\mu_j\\ \nabla_j\mu^i + \delta_j^i\rho + P_j^i\sigma\\ \nabla_j\rho - P_{ji}\mu^i\end{bmatrix}.$$
The metric, on $U^I=(\sigma\ \mu^i\ \rho)$ and $V^J=(\tau\ \nu^j\ \alpha)$ is:
$$G_{IJ}U^IV^J = \mu^i\nu_i + \sigma\tau + \rho\alpha$$
The preferred line bundle $\mathcal X$ is the span of
$$X^I = \begin{bmatrix}0\\0\\1\end{bmatrix}.$$

Given a change in Weyl gauge $\widehat g_{ij} = e^{2\gamma}g_{ij}$, the components of the tractor bundle change according to the rule
$$\begin{bmatrix}\widehat\sigma\\\widehat \mu^i\\\widehat\rho\end{bmatrix} = \begin{bmatrix}\sigma\\ \mu^i+\gamma^i\sigma\\ \rho-\gamma_j\mu^j - \gamma^2\sigma/2\end{bmatrix}$$
where $\gamma_i=\nabla_i\gamma$, and the inverse metric $g^{ij}$ has been used in one place to raise the index. Clearly the bundle $\mathcal X$ is invariant under the change in gauge, and the connection can be shown to be invariant using the conformal change in the Levi-Civita connection and Schouten tensor.

== Projective manifolds ==
Let $M$ be a projective manifold of dimension $n$. Then the tractor bundle is a rank $n+1$ vector bundle $\mathcal T$, with connection $\nabla$, on $M$ equipped with the additional data of a line subbundle $\mathcal X$ such that, for any non-vanishing local section $X$ of $\mathcal X$, the linear operator
$$v\mapsto \nabla_v X\pmod{\mathcal X}$$
is a linear isomorphism of the tangent space to $\mathcal T/\mathcal X$.

One recovers an affine connection in the projective class from a section $X$ of $\mathcal X$ by defining
$$\nabla_{\nabla_vw}X = \nabla_v\nabla_wX \pmod{\mathcal X}$$
and using the aforementioned isomorphism.

Explicitly, the tractor bundle can be represented in a given affine chart by pairs $(\mu^i\ \rho)$, where the connection is
$$\nabla_j\begin{bmatrix}\mu^i\\ \rho\end{bmatrix} = \begin{bmatrix}\nabla_j\mu^i + \delta_j^i\rho\\ \nabla_j\rho - P_{ij}\mu^i\end{bmatrix}$$
where $P_{ij}$ is the projective Schouten tensor. The preferred subbundle $\mathcal X$ is that spanned by $X=(0\ 1)$.

Here the projective Schouten tensor of an affine connection is defined as follows. Define the Riemann tensor in the usual way (indices are abstract)
$$(\nabla_i\nabla_j-\nabla_j\nabla_i)U^\ell = {R_{ijk}}^\ell U^k.$$
Then
$${R_{ijk}}^\ell = {C_{ijk}}^\ell + 2\delta^\ell_{[i}P_{j]k} + \beta_{ij}\delta_k^\ell$$
where the Weyl tensor ${C_{ijk}}^\ell$ is trace-free, and $2P_{[ij]} = -\beta_{ij}$ (by Bianchi).
