= Codazzi tensor =

In the mathematical field of differential geometry, a Codazzi tensor (named after Delfino Codazzi) is a symmetric 2-tensor whose covariant derivative is also symmetric. Such tensors arise naturally in the study of Riemannian manifolds with harmonic curvature or harmonic Weyl tensor. In fact, existence of Codazzi tensors impose strict conditions on the curvature tensor of the manifold. Also, the second fundamental form of an immersed hypersurface in a space form (relative to a local choice of normal field) is a Codazzi tensor.

== Definition ==
Let $(M,g)$ be a n-dimensional Riemannian manifold for $n \geq 3$, let $T$ be a symmetric 2-tensor field, and let $\nabla$ be the Levi-Civita connection. We say that the tensor $T$ is a Codazzi tensor if

$$(\nabla_X T)(Y,Z) = (\nabla_Y T)(X,Z)$$

for all $X,Y,Z\in\mathfrak{X}(M).$

== Examples ==
- Any parallel (0,2)-tensor field is, trivially, Codazzi.
- Let $(N,\overline{g})$ be a space form, let $M$ be a smooth manifold with $1+\dim M=\dim N,$ and let $F:M\to N$ be an immersion. If there is a global choice of unit normal vector field, then relative to this choice, the second fundamental form is a Codazzi tensor on $M.$ This is an immediate consequence of the Gauss-Codazzi equations.
- Let $(M,g)$ be a space form with constant curvature $\kappa.$ Given any function $f$ on $M,$ the tensor $\operatorname{Hess}^gf+\kappa fg$ is Codazzi. This is a consequence of the commutation formula for covariant differentiation.
- Let $(M,g)$ be a two-dimensional Riemannian manifold, and let $K$ be the Gaussian curvature. Then $2\operatorname{Hess}^gK+K^2g$ is a Codazzi tensor. This is a consequence of the commutation formula for covariant differentiation.
- Let Rm denote the Riemann curvature tensor. Then div(Rm)=0 ("g has harmonic curvature tensor") if and only if the Ricci tensor is a Codazzi tensor. This is an immediate consequence of the contracted Bianchi identity.
- Let W denote the Weyl curvature tensor. Then $\operatorname{div}W=0$ ("g has harmonic Weyl tensor") if and only if the "Schouten tensor"

$$\operatorname{Ric}-\frac{1}{2n-2}Rg$$

is a Codazzi tensor. This is an immediate consequence of the definition of the Weyl tensor and the contracted Bianchi identity.

== Rigidity ==
Matsushima and Tanno showed that, on a Kähler manifold, any Codazzi tensor which is hermitian is parallel. Berger showed that, on a compact manifold of nonnegative sectional curvature, any Codazzi tensor h with tr_{g}h constant must be parallel. Furthermore, on a compact manifold of nonnegative sectional curvature, if the sectional curvature is strictly positive at least one point, then every symmetric parallel 2-tensor is a constant multiple of the metric.

== See also ==
- Weyl–Schouten theorem
