= Higher-spin theory =

Theory with particles of spin more than two

Higher-spin theory or higher-spin gravity is a common name for field theories that contain massless fields of spin greater than two. Usually, the spectrum of such theories contains the graviton as a massless spin-two field, which explains the second name. Massless fields are gauge fields and the theories should be (almost) completely fixed by these higher-spin symmetries. Higher-spin theories are supposed to be consistent quantum theories and, for this reason, to give examples of quantum gravity. Most of the interest in the topic is due to the AdS/CFT correspondence where there is a number of conjectures relating higher-spin theories to weakly coupled conformal field theories. Only certain parts of these theories are known at present (in particular, standard action principles are not known) and not many examples have been worked out in detail except some specific toy models (such as the higher-spin extension of pure Chern–Simons, Jackiw–Teitelboim, selfdual (chiral) and Weyl gravity theories).

== Free higher-spin fields ==
Systematic study of massless arbitrary spin fields was initiated by Christian Fronsdal. A free spin-s field can be represented by a tensor gauge field.

$$\delta \Phi_{\mu_1\mu_2...\mu_s}=\partial_{\mu_1}\xi_{\mu_2...\mu_s}+\text{permutations}$$

This (linearised) gauge symmetry generalises that of massless spin-one (photon) $\delta A_\mu =\partial_\mu \xi$ and that of massless spin-two (graviton) $\delta h_{\mu\nu}=\partial_\mu \xi_\nu +\partial_\nu \xi_\mu$. Fronsdal also found linear equations of motion and a quadratic action that is invariant under the symmetries above. For example, the equations are

$$\square \Phi_{\mu_1\mu_2...\mu_s} -\left(\partial_{\mu_1}\partial^\nu \Phi_{\nu\mu_2...\mu_s}+\text{ permutations}\right) + \frac12 \left(
\partial_{\mu_1}\partial_{\mu_2}\Phi^\nu{}_{\nu\mu_3...\mu_s}+\text{permutations}\right)=0$$

where in the first bracket one needs $s-1$ terms more to make the expression symmetric and in the second bracket one needs $s(s-1)/2-1$ permutations. The equations are gauge invariant provided the field is double-traceless $\Phi^\nu{}_\nu{}^\lambda{}_{\lambda\mu_5...\mu_s}=0$ and the gauge parameter is traceless $\xi^\nu{}_{\nu\mu_3...\mu_{s-1}}=0$.

Essentially, the higher spin problem can be stated as a problem to find a nontrivial interacting theory with at least one massless higher-spin field (higher in this context usually means greater than two).

A theory for massive arbitrary higher-spin fields is proposed by C. Hagen and L. Singh. This massive theory is important because, according to various conjectures, spontaneously broken gauges of higher-spins may contain an infinite tower of massive higher-spin particles on the top of the massless modes of lower spins s ≤ 2 like graviton similarly as in string theories.

The linearized version of the higher-spin supergravity gives rise to dual graviton field in first order form. Interestingly, the Curtright field of such dual gravity model is of a mixed symmetry, hence the dual gravity theory can also be massive. Also the chiral and nonchiral actions can be obtained from the manifestly covariant Curtright action.

== No-go theorems ==
Possible interactions of massless higher spin particles with themselves and with low spin particles are (over)constrained by the basic principles of quantum field theory like Lorentz invariance. Many results in the form of no-go theorems have been obtained up to date

=== Flat space ===
Most of the no-go theorems constrain interactions in the flat space.

One of the most well-known is the Weinberg low energy theorem that explains why there are no macroscopic fields corresponding to particles of spin 3 or higher. The Weinberg theorem can be interpreted in the following way: Lorentz invariance of the S-matrix is equivalent, for massless particles, to decoupling of longitudinal states. The latter is equivalent to gauge invariance under the linearised gauge symmetries above. These symmetries lead, for $s>2$, to 'too many' conservation laws that trivialise scattering so that $S=1$.

Another well-known result is the Coleman–Mandula theorem. that, under certain assumptions, states that any symmetry group of S-matrix is necessarily locally isomorphic to the direct product of an internal symmetry group and the Poincaré group. This means that there cannot be any symmetry generators transforming as tensors of the Lorentz group – S-matrix cannot have symmetries that would be associated with higher spin charges.

Massless higher spin particles also cannot consistently couple to nontrivial gravitational backgrounds. An attempt to simply replace partial derivatives with the covariant ones turns out to be inconsistent with gauge invariance. Nevertheless, a consistent gravitational coupling does exist in the light-cone gauge (to the lowest order).

Other no-go results include a direct analysis of possible interactions and show, for example, that the gauge symmetries cannot be deformed in a consistent way so that they form an algebra.

=== Anti-de Sitter space ===
In anti-de Sitter space some of the flat space no-go results are still valid and some get slightly modified. In particular, it was shown by Fradkin and Vasiliev that one can consistently couple massless higher-spin fields to gravity at the first non-trivial order. The same result in flat space was obtained by Bengtsson, Bengtsson and Linden in the light-cone gauge the same year. The difference between the flat space result and the AdS one is that the gravitational coupling of massless higher-spin fields cannot be written in the manifestly covariant form in flat space as different from the AdS case.

An AdS analog of the Coleman–Mandula theorem was obtained by Maldacena and Zhiboedov. AdS/CFT correspondence replaces the flat space S-matrix with the holographic correlation functions. It then can be shown that the asymptotic higher-spin symmetry in anti-de Sitter space implies that the holographic correlation functions are those of the singlet sector a free vector model conformal field theory (see also higher-spin AdS/CFT correspondence below). Let us stress that all n-point correlation functions are not vanishing so this statement is not exactly the analogue of the triviality of the S-matrix. An important difference from the flat space results, e.g. Coleman–Mandula and Weinberg theorems, is that one can break higher-spin symmetry in a controllable way, which is called slightly broken higher-spin symmetry. In the latter case the holographic S-matrix corresponds to highly nontrivial Chern–Simons matter theories rather than to a free CFT.

As in the flat space case, other no-go results include a direct analysis of possible interactions. Starting from the quartic order a generic higher-spin gravity (defined to be the dual of the free vector model, see also higher-spin AdS/CFT correspondence below) is plagued by non-localities, which is the same problem as in flat space.

== Various approaches to higher-spin theories ==
The existence of many higher-spin theories is well-justified on the basis of AdS/correspondence, but none of these hypothetical theories is known in full detail. Most of the common approaches to the higher-spin problem are described below.

=== Chiral higher-spin gravity ===
Generic theories with massless higher-spin fields are obstructed by non-localities, see No-go theorems. Chiral higher-spin gravity is a unique higher-spin theory with propagating massless fields that is not plagued by non-localities. It is the smallest nontrivial extension of the graviton with massless higher-spin fields in four dimensions. It has a simple action in the light-cone gauge:

$$\mathcal{S}=\int \mathrm{d}^4x \left[\sum_{\lambda\geq0} \Phi_{-\lambda} \square \Phi_{\lambda}+\sum_{\lambda_{1,2,3}} \frac{g\, {\mathrm{l_p}}^{\lambda_1+\lambda_2+\lambda_3-1} }{\Gamma(\lambda_1+\lambda_2+\lambda_3)} V_{\lambda_1,\lambda_2,\lambda_3} \Phi_{\lambda_1}\Phi_{\lambda_2}\Phi_{\lambda_3}\right]$$

where $\Phi_\lambda(x)$ represents two helicity eigen-states $\lambda=\pm s$ of a massless spin-$s$ field in four dimensions (for low spins one finds $\Phi_0$ representing a scalar field, where light-cone gauge makes no difference; one finds $\Phi_{\pm1}$ for photons and $\Phi_{\pm2}$ for gravitons). The action has two coupling constants: a dimensionless $g$ and a dimensionful $\mathrm{l}_p$ which can be associated with the Planck length. Given three helicities $\lambda_{1,2,3}$ fixed there is a unique cubic interaction $V_{\lambda_1,\lambda_2,\lambda_3}$, which in the spinor-helicity base can be represented as $[12]^{\lambda_1+\lambda_2-\lambda_3}[23]^{\lambda_2+\lambda_3-\lambda_1}[13]^{\lambda_1+\lambda_3-\lambda_2}$ for positive $\lambda_1+\lambda_2+\lambda_3$. The main feature of chiral theory is the dependence of couplings on the helicities $\Gamma(\lambda_1+\lambda_2+\lambda_3)^{-1}$, which forces the sum $\lambda_1+\lambda_2+\lambda_3$ to be positive (there exists an anti-chiral theory where the sum is negative). The theory is one-loop finite and its one-loop amplitudes are related to those of self-dual Yang-Mills theory. The theory can be thought of as a higher-spin extension of self-dual Yang–Mills theory. Chiral theory admits an extension to anti-de Sitter space, where it is a unique perturbatively local higher-spin theory with propagating massless higher-spin fields.

=== Conformal higher-spin gravity ===
Usual massless higher-spin symmetries generalise the action of the linearised diffeomorphisms from the metric tensor to higher-spin fields. In the context of gravity one may also be interested in conformal gravity that enlarges diffeomorphisms with Weyl transformations $g_{\mu\nu}\rightarrow\Omega^2(x)g_{\mu\nu}$ where $\Omega(x)$ is an arbitrary function. The simplest example of a conformal gravity is in four dimensions

$$\mathcal{S}=\int \mathrm{d}^4x \sqrt{-g} C_{\mu\nu\lambda\rho}C^{\mu\nu\lambda\rho}$$

One can try to generalise this idea to higher-spin fields by postulating the linearised gauge transformations of the form

$$\delta \Phi_{\mu_1\mu_2...\mu_s}=\partial_{\mu_1}\xi_{\mu_2...\mu_s}+g_{\mu_1\mu_2} \zeta_{\mu_3...\mu_s}+\text{permutations}$$

where $\zeta_{\mu_1...\mu_{s-2}}$ is a higher-spin generalisation of the Weyl symmetry. As different from massless higher-spin fields, conformal higher-spin fields are much more tractable: they can propagate on nontrivial gravitational background and admit interactions in flat space. In particular, the action of conformal higher-spin theories is known to some extent – it can be obtained as an effective action for a free conformal field theory coupled to the conformal higher-spin background.

=== Collective dipole ===
The idea is conceptually similar to the reconstruction approach just described, but performs a complete reconstruction in some sense. One begins with the free $O(N)$ model partition function and performs a change of variables by passing from the $O(N)$ scalar fields $\phi^i(x)$, $i=1,...,N$ to a new bi-local variable $\Psi(x,y)=\sum_i \phi^i(x)\phi^i(y)$. In the limit of large $N$ this change of variables is well-defined, but has a nontrivial Jacobian. The same partition function can then be rewritten as a path integral over bi-local $\Psi(x,y)$. It can also be shown that in the free approximation the bi-local variables describe free massless fields of all spins $s=0,1,2,3,....$ in anti-de Sitter space. Therefore, the action in term of the bi-local $\Psi(x,y)$ is a candidate for the action of a higher-spin theory

=== Holographic RG flow ===
The idea is that the equations of the exact renormalization group can be reinterpreted as equations of motions with the RG energy scale playing the role of the radial coordinate in anti-de Sitter space. This idea can be applied to the conjectural duals of higher-spin theories, for example, to the free $O(N)$ model.

=== Noether procedure ===
Noether procedure is a canonical perturbative method to introduce interactions. One begins with a sum of free (quadratic) actions $S_2$ and linearised gauge symmetries $\delta_0$, which are given by Fronsdal Lagrangian and by the gauge transformations above. The idea is to add all possible corrections that are cubic in the fields $S_3$ and, at the same time, allow for field-dependent deformations $\delta_1$ of the gauge transformations. One then requires the full action to be gauge invariant

$$0=\delta S=\delta_0 S_2+\delta_0 S_3 +\delta_1 S_2+...$$

and solves this constraint at the first nontrivial order in the weak-field expansion (note that $\delta_0 S_2=0$ because the free action is gauge invariant). Therefore, the first condition is $\delta_0 S_3 +\delta_1 S_2=0$. One has to mod out by the trivial solutions that result from nonlinear field redefinitions in the free action. The deformation procedure may not stop at this order and one may have to add quartic terms $S_4$ and further corrections $\delta_2$ to the gauge transformations that are quadratic in the fields and so on. The systematic approach is via BV-BRST techniques. Unfortunately, the Noether procedure approach has not given yet any complete example of a higher-spin theory, the difficulties being not only in the technicalities but also in the conceptual understanding of locality in higher-spin theories. Unless locality is imposed one can always find a solution to the Noether procedure (for example, by inverting the kinetic operator in $\delta_0 S_3 +\delta_1 S_2=0$ that results from the second term) or, the same time, by performing a suitable nonlocal redefinition one can remove any interaction. At present, it seems that higher-spin theories cannot be fully understood as field theories due to quite non-local interactions they have.

=== Reconstruction ===
The higher-spin AdS/CFT correspondence can be used in the reverse order – one can attempt to build the interaction vertices of the higher-spin theory in such a way that they reproduce the correlation functions of a given conjectural CFT dual. This approach takes advantage of the fact that the kinematics of AdS theories is, to some extent, equivalent to the kinematics of conformal field theories in one dimension lower – one has exactly the same number of independent structures on both sides. In particular, the cubic part of the action of the Type-A higher-spin theory was found by inverting the three-point functions of the higher-spin currents in the free scalar CFT. Some quartic vertices have been reconstructed too.

=== Three dimensions and Chern–Simons ===
In three dimensions neither gravity nor massless higher-spin fields have any propagating degrees of freedom. It is known that the Einstein–Hilbert action with negative cosmological constant can be rewritten in the Chern–Simons form for $SL(2,\mathbb{R})\oplus SL(2,\mathbb{R})$

$$S=S_{CS}(A)-S_{CS}(\bar{A}) \qquad \qquad S_{CS}(A)=\frac{k}{4\pi} \int \mathrm{tr}(A\wedge dA+\frac23 A\wedge A \wedge A)\,,$$

where there are two independent $sl(2,\mathbb{R})$-connections, $A$ and $\bar{A}$. Due to isomorphisms $so(2,2)\sim sl(2,\mathbb{R})\oplus sl(2,\mathbb{R})$ and $sl(2,\mathbb{R})\sim so(2,1)$ the algebra $sl(2,\mathbb{R})$ can be understood as the Lorentz algebra in three dimensions. These two connections are related to vielbein $e^a_\mu$ and spin-connection $\omega^{a,b}_\mu$ (Note that in three dimensions, the spin-connection, being anti-symmetric in $a,b$ is equivalent to an $so(2,1)$ vector via $\tilde{\omega}^a_\mu=\epsilon^a{}_{bc}\omega^{b,c}_\mu$, where $\epsilon^{abc}$ is the totally anti-symmetric Levi-Civita symbol). Higher-spin extensions are straightforward to construct: instead of $sl(2,\mathbb{R})\oplus sl(2,\mathbb{R})$ connection one can take a connection of $\mathfrak{g}\oplus \mathfrak{g}$, where $\mathfrak{g}$ is any Lie algebra containing the 'gravitational' $sl(2,\mathbb{R})$ subalgebra. Such theories have been extensively studied due their relation to AdS/CFT and W-algebras as asymptotic symmetries.

=== Vasiliev equations ===
Vasiliev equations are formally consistent gauge invariant nonlinear equations whose linearization over a specific vacuum solution describes free massless higher-spin fields on anti-de Sitter space. The Vasiliev equations are classical equations and no Lagrangian is known that starts from canonical two-derivative Fronsdal Lagrangian and is completed by interactions terms. There is a number of variations of Vasiliev equations that work in three, four and arbitrary number of space-time dimensions. Vasiliev's equations admit supersymmetric extensions with any number of super-symmetries and allow for Yang–Mills gaugings. Vasiliev's equations are background independent, the simplest exact solution being anti-de Sitter space. However, locality has not been an assumption used in the derivation and, for this reason, some of the results obtained from the equations are inconsistent with higher-spin theories and AdS/CFT duality. Locality issues remain to be clarified.

== Higher-spin AdS/CFT correspondence ==
Higher-spin theories are of interest as models of AdS/CFT correspondence.

=== Klebanov–Polyakov conjecture ===
In 2002, Klebanov and Polyakov put forward a conjecture that the free and critical $O(N)$ vector models, as conformal field theories in three dimensions, should be dual to a theory in four-dimensional anti-de Sitter space with infinite number of massless higher-spin gauge fields. This conjecture was further extended and generalised to Gross–Neveu and super-symmetric models. The most general extension is to a class of Chern–Simons matter theories.

The rationale for the conjectures is that there are some conformal field theories that, in addition to the stress-tensor, have an infinite number of conserved tensors $\partial^c j_{ca_2...a_s}=0$, where spin runs over all positive integers $s=1,2,3,...$ (in the $O(N)$ model the spin is even). The stress-tensor corresponds to the $s=2$ case. By the standard AdS/CFT lore, the fields that are dual to conserved currents have to be gauge fields. For example, the stress-tensor is dual to the spin-two graviton field. A generic example of a conformal field theory with higher-spin currents is any free CFT. For instance, the free $O(N)$ model is defined by

$$S=\frac12 \int d^dx\, \partial_m\phi^i \partial^m \phi^j \delta_{ij},$$

where $i,j=1,...,N$. It can be shown that there exist an infinite number of quasi-primary operators

$$j_{a_1a_2...a_s}=\partial_{a_1}...\partial_{a_s}\phi^i \phi^j\delta_{ij} +\text{plus terms with different arrangement of derivatives and minus traces}$$

that are conserved. Under certain assumptions it was shown by Maldacena and Zhiboedov that 3d conformal field theories with higher spin currents are free, which can be extended to any dimension greater than two. Therefore, higher-spin theories are generic duals of free conformal field theories. A theory that is dual to the free scalar CFT is called Type-A in the literature and the theory that is dual to the free fermion CFT is called Type-B.

Another example is the critical vector model, which is a theory with action

$$S= \int d^3x\, \frac12\partial_m\phi^i \partial^m \phi^j \delta_{ij}+\frac{\lambda}{4} (\phi^i \phi^j \delta_{ij})^2$$

taken at the fixed point. This theory is interacting and does not have conserved higher-spin currents. However, in the large N limit it can be shown to have 'almost' conserved higher-spin currents and the conservation is broken by $1/N$ effects. More generally, free and critical vector models belong to the class of Chern–Simons matter theories that have slightly broken higher-spin symmetry.

=== Gaberdiel–Gopakumar conjecture ===
The conjecture put forward by Gaberdiel and Gopakumar is an extension of the Klebanov–Polyakov conjecture to $AdS_3/CFT^2$. It states that the $W_N$ minimal models in the large $N$ limit should be dual to theories with massless higher-spin fields and two scalar fields. Massless higher-spin fields do not propagate in three dimensions, but can be described, as is discussed above, by the Chern–Simons action. However, it is not known to extend this action as to include the matter fields required by the duality.

== See also ==
- Bargmann–Wigner equations
- Joos–Weinberg equation
