= Vasiliev equations =

Equations relating to massless particles in AdS space

Vasiliev equations are formally consistent gauge invariant nonlinear equations whose linearization over a specific vacuum solution describes free massless higher-spin fields on anti-de Sitter space. The Vasiliev equations are classical equations and no Lagrangian is known that starts from canonical two-derivative Frønsdal Lagrangian and is completed by interactions terms. There is a number of variations of Vasiliev equations that work in three, four and arbitrary number of space-time dimensions. Vasiliev's equations admit supersymmetric extensions with any number of super-symmetries and allow for Yang–Mills gaugings. Vasiliev's equations are background independent, the simplest exact solution being anti-de Sitter space. Locality is not properly implemented and the equations give a solution of certain formal deformation procedure, which is difficult to map to field theory language. The higher-spin AdS/CFT correspondence is reviewed in Higher-spin theory article.

The Vasiliev equations are generating equations and yield differential equations in the space-time upon solving them order by order with respect to certain auxiliary directions. The equations rely on several ingredients: unfolded equations and higher-spin algebras.

The exposition below is organised in such a way as to split the Vasiliev's equations into the building blocks and then join them together. The example of the four-dimensional bosonic Vasiliev's equations is reviewed at length since all other dimensions and super-symmetric generalisations are simple modifications of this basic example.

- the definition of the higher-spin algebra is given since the higher-spin theory equations turns out to be the equations for two fields taking values in the higher-spin algebra;
- the specific star-product that the fields that enter Vasiliev's equations take values in is defined;
- part of the Vasiliev equations is related to an interesting deformation of the Harmonic oscillator, called deformed oscillators, which is reviewed;
- the unfolded approach is discussed, which is a slightly advanced form of writing the differential equations in the first order form;
- the Vasiliev equations are given;
- it is proved that the linearisation of Vasiliev's equations over anti-de Sitter space describes free massless higher-spin fields.

Three variations of Vasiliev's equations are known: four-dimensional, three-dimensional and d-dimensional. They differ by mild details that are discussed below.

== Higher-spin algebras ==
Higher-spin algebras are global symmetries of the higher-spin theory multiplet. The same time they can be defined as global symmetries of some conformal field theories (CFT), which underlies the kinematic part of the higher-spin AdS/CFT correspondence, which is a particular case of the AdS/CFT. Another definition is that higher-spin algebras are quotients of the universal enveloping algebra of the anti-de Sitter algebra $so(d,2)$ by certain two-sided ideals. Some more complicated examples of higher-spin algebras exist, but all of them can be obtained by tensoring the simplest higher-spin algebras with matrix algebras and then imposing further constraints. Higher-spin algebras originate as associative algebras and the Lie algebra can be constructed via the commutator.

In the case of the four-dimensional bosonic higher-spin theory the relevant higher-spin algebra is very simple thanks to $so(3,2)\sim sp(4,\mathbb{R})$ and can be built upon two-dimensional quantum Harmonic oscillator. In the latter case two pairs of creation/annihilation operators $a_1,a^\dagger_1, a_2,a_2^\dagger$ are needed. These can be packed into the quartet $\hat{Y}^A, A=1,...,4$ of operators obeying the canonical commutation relations

$$[\hat{Y}^A,\hat{Y}^B]=2iC^{AB}\,,$$

where $C^{AB}=-C^{BA}$ is the $sp(4)$ invariant tensor, i.e. it is anti-symmetric. As is well known, the bilinears provide an oscillator realization of $sp(4)$:

$$T^{AB}=-\frac{i}4\{\hat{Y}^A,\hat{Y}^B\}\,, \qquad [T^{AB},T^{CD}]=T^{AD}C^{BC}+\text{3 more}\,.$$

The higher-spin algebra is defined as the algebra of all even functions $f(\hat{Y}), f(\hat{Y})=f(-\hat{Y})$ in $\hat{Y}^A$. That the functions are even is in accordance with the bosonic content of the higher-spin theory as $\hat{Y}^A$ will be shown to be related to the Majorana spinors from the space-time point of view and even powers of $\hat{Y}^A$ correspond to tensors. It is an associative algebra and the product is conveniently realised by the Moyal star product:

$$(f\star g)(Y)=f(Y)\exp i\left({\frac{\overleftarrow{\partial}}{\partial Y^A} C^{AB} \frac{\overrightarrow{\partial}}{\partial Y^B }}\right)g(Y)\,,$$

with the meaning that the algebra of operators $f(\hat{Y})$ can be replaced with the algebra of function $f(Y)$ in ordinary commuting variables ${Y}^A$ (hats off) and the product needs to be replaced with the non-commutative star-product. For example, one finds

$$(Y^A \star g)(Y)=(Y^A+iC^{AB}\partial_B)g(Y)\,, \qquad (f \star Y^B)(Y)=(Y^B-iC^{BA}\partial_B)f(Y)\,,$$

and therefore $Y^A\star Y^B-Y^B\star Y^A=[Y^A,Y^B]_\star=2iC^{AB}$ as it would be the case for the operators. Another representation of the same star-product is more useful in practice:

$$(f\star g)(Y)=\frac{1}{(2\pi)^4}\int dU dV f(Y+U) g(Y+V) e^{iU_A V_BC^{AB}}\,.$$

The exponential formula can be derived by integrating by parts and dropping the boundary terms. The prefactor is chosen as to ensure $1\star 1=1$. In the Lorentz-covariant base we can split $A=\alpha,\dot{\alpha};\alpha=1,2;\dot{\alpha}=1,2$ and we also split $Y^A=y^\alpha,y^{\dot{\alpha}}$. Then the Lorentz generators are $L^{\alpha\beta}=T^{\alpha\beta}$, $\bar{L}^{\dot{\alpha}\dot{\beta}}=T^{\dot{\alpha}\dot{\beta}}$ and the translation generators are $P^{\alpha\dot{\beta}}=T^{{\alpha}\dot{\beta}}$. The $\pi$-automorphism can be realized in two equivalent ways: either as $\pi(y^\alpha)=-y^\alpha, \pi(y^{\dot{\alpha}})=y^{\dot{\alpha}}$ or as $\pi(y^\alpha)=Y^\alpha, \pi(y^{\dot{\alpha}})=-y^{\dot{\alpha}}$. In both the cases it leaves the Lorentz generators untouched and flips the sign of translations.

The higher-spin algebra constructed above can be shown to be the symmetry algebra of the three-dimensional Klein–Gordon equation $\square_3 \phi(x)=0$. Considering more general free CFT's, e.g. a number of scalars plus a number of fermions, the Maxwell field and other, one can construct more examples of higher-spin algebras.

== Vasiliev star-product ==
The Vasiliev equations are equations in certain bigger space endowed with auxiliary directions to be solved for. The additional directions are given by the doubles of ${Y}^A$, called ${Z}^A$, which are furthermore entangled with Y. The star-product on the algebra of functions in $f(Y,Z)$ in ${Y}, Z$-variables is

$$F(Y,Z)\star G(Y,Z) =\frac{1}{(2\pi)^4}\int dU\, dV\, F(Y+U,Z+U) G(Y+V,Z-V)\exp{[i U_A V_B C^{AB}]}\,.$$

The integral formula here-above is a particular star-product that corresponds to the Weyl ordering among Y's and among Z's, with the opposite signs for the commutator:

$$[Y^A,Y^B]=2iC^{AB}\,, \qquad\qquad [Z^A,Z^B]=-2i C^{AB} \,.$$

Moreover, the Y-Z star product is normal ordered with respect to Y-Z and Y+Z as is seen from

$$\begin{align}F(a,a^\dagger)\star G(a,a^\dagger) &=\frac{1}{(2\pi)^4}\int dU\, dV\, F(a+2U,a^\dagger) G(a,a^\dagger+2V)\exp{[i U_A V_B C^{AB}]} \,,
&\quad a=Y+Z\,, a^\dagger =Y-Z\end{align}$$

The higher-spin algebra is an associative subalgebra in the extended algebra. In accordance with the bosonic projection is given by $f(Y,Z)=f(-Y,-Z)$.

== Deformed oscillators ==
The essential part of the Vasiliev equations relies on an interesting deformation of the Quantum harmonic oscillator, known as deformed oscillators. First of all, let us pack the usual creation and annihilation operators $a^\dagger, a$ in a doublet $q_\alpha\,,\alpha=1,2$. The canonical commutation relations (the $2i$-factors are introduced to facilitate comparison with Vasiliev's equations)

$$\left[q_\alpha,q_\beta\right]=-2i\epsilon_{\alpha\beta}\,, \qquad \epsilon_{\alpha\beta}=\begin{bmatrix} 0 &1 \\-1 &0\end{bmatrix}\,,$$

can be used to prove that the bilinears in $q_\alpha$ form $sp(2)\sim sl(2)$ generators

$$\begin{align}
T_{\alpha\beta}&=\frac{i}{4}\{q_\alpha,q_\beta\}\,, \\
\left[T_{\alpha\beta},q_\gamma\right]&= q_\alpha \epsilon_{\beta\gamma}+q_\beta \epsilon_{\alpha\gamma} \,,\\
\left[T_{\alpha\beta},T_{\gamma\delta}\right]&=T_{\alpha\delta}\epsilon_{\beta\gamma}+T_{\beta\delta}\epsilon_{\alpha\gamma}+T_{\alpha\gamma}\epsilon_{\beta\delta}+T_{\beta\gamma}\epsilon_{\alpha\delta}\,.
\end{align}$$

In particular, $T_{\alpha\beta}$ rotates $q_\alpha$ as an $sp(2)$-vector with $\epsilon_{\alpha\beta}$ playing the role of the $sp(2)$-invariant metric. The deformed oscillators are defined by appending the set of generators with an additional generating element $Q$ and postulating

$$\{q_\alpha, Q\}=0\,,  \qquad \left[q_\alpha,q_\beta\right]=-2i\epsilon_{\alpha\beta}(1+Q)\,.$$

Again, one can see that $T_{\alpha\beta}$, as defined above, form $sp(2)$-generators and rotate properly $q_\alpha$. At $Q=0$ we get back to the undeformed oscillators. In fact, $q_\alpha$ and $T_{\alpha\beta}$ form the generators of the Lie superalgebra $osp(1|2)$, where $q_\alpha$ should be viewed as odd generators. Then, $\{q_\alpha,q_\beta\}=-4iT_{\alpha\beta}$ is the part of the defining relations of $osp(1|2)$. One (or two) copies of the deformed oscillator relations form a part of the Vasiliev equations where the generators are replaced with fields and the commutation relations are imposed as field equations.

== Unfolded equations ==
The equations for higher-spin fields originate from the Vasiliev equations in the unfolded form. Any set of differential equations can be put in the first order form by introducing auxiliary fields to denote derivatives. Unfolded approach is an advanced reformulation of this idea that takes into account gauge symmetries and diffeomorphisms. Instead of just $\partial_\mu \phi^i(x)=f_\mu^i(\phi)$ the unfolded equations are written in the language of differential forms as

$$d W^A =F^A(W)\,,$$

where the variables are differential forms $W^A=W^A_{\mu_1...\mu_q}(x)\,dx^{\mu_1}\wedge...\wedge dx^{\mu_q}$ of various degrees, enumerated by an abstract index $A$; $d$ is the exterior derivative $d=dx^\mu\partial_\mu$. The structure function $F^A(W)$ is assumed to be expandable in exterior product Taylor series as

$$F^A(W)=\sum_{q_1+...+q_n=q+1} F^A_{B_1...B_n} W^{B_1}\wedge ...\wedge W^{B_n}\,,$$

where $W^A$ has form degree $q$ and the sum is over all forms whose form degrees add up to $q+1$. The simplest example of unfolded equations are the zero curvature equations $d\omega=\tfrac12[\omega,\omega]$ for a one-form connection $\omega$ of any Lie algebra $\mathfrak{g}$. Here $A$ runs over the base of the Lie algebra, and the structure function $F^A(\omega)=f^A_{BC}\,\omega^A\wedge \omega^B$ encodes the structure constants of the Lie algebra.

Since $dd\equiv0$ the consistency of the unfolded equations requires

$$0\equiv ddW^A=dF^A(W)=dW^B\frac{\partial}{\partial W^B}F^A(W)=F^B\frac{\partial}{\partial W^B}F^A(W) \qquad \longleftrightarrow\qquad F^B\frac{\partial}{\partial W^B}F^A(W)=0 \,,$$

which is the Frobenius integrability condition. In the case of the zero curvature equation this is just the Jacobi identity. Once the system is integrable it can be shown to have certain gauge symmetries. Every field $W^A$ that is a form of non-zero degree $q$ possesses a gauge parameter $\xi^A$ that is a form of degree $q-1$ and the gauge transformations are

$$\delta W^A=d\xi^A+\xi^B\frac{\partial }{\partial W^B}F^A(W)$$

The Vasiliev equations generate the unfolded equations for a specific field content, which consists of a one-form $\omega$ and a zero-form $C$, both taking values in the higher-spin algebra. Therefore, $W^A=(\omega,C)$ and $\omega=\omega_\mu(Y|x)dx^\mu, \omega(Y|x)=\omega(-Y|x)$, $C=C(Y|x), C(Y|x)=C(-Y|x)$. The unfolded equations that describe interactions of higher-spin fields are

$$\begin{align}
d\omega&=\omega \star \omega +\mathcal{V}(\omega,\omega,C)+\mathcal{V}(\omega,\omega,C,C)+...\,,\\
dC&=\omega\star C-C\star \pi(\omega)+\mathcal{V}(\omega,C,C)+...\,,
\end{align}$$

where $\mathcal{V}(\omega,...,C)$ are the interaction vertices that are of higher and higher order in the $C$-field. The product in the higher-spin algebra is denoted by $\star$. The explicit form of the vertices can be extracted from the Vasiliev equations. The vertices that are bilinear in the fields are determined by the higher-spin algebra. Automorphism $\pi$ is induced by the automorphism of the anti-de Sitter algebra that flips the sign of translations, see below. If we truncate away higher orders in the $C$-expansion, the equations are just the zero-curvature condition for a connection $\omega$ of the higher-spin algebra and the covariant constancy equation for a zero-form $C$ that takes values in the twisted-adjoint representation (twist is by the automorphism $\pi$).

== Field content ==
The field content of the Vasiliev equations is given by three fields all taking values in the extended algebra of functions in Y and Z:

- gauge connection $W=W_\mu(Y,Z|x)\, dx^\mu$, whose value at Z=0 gives the connection of the higher-spin algebra $\omega=\omega_\mu(Y|x)\, dx^\mu$. The bosonic projection implies $W(Y,Z|x)=W(-Y,-Z|x)$;
- zero-form $B=B(Y,Z|x)$, whose value at Z=0 gives the zero-form of the higher-spin algebra $C=C(Y|x)$. The bosonic projection implies $B(Y,Z|x)=B(-Y,-Z|x)$;
- an auxiliary field $S=S_A(Y,Z|x)\, dZ^A$, where it is sometimes useful to view it as a one-form in the auxiliary Z-space, hence the differentials: $dZ^A\wedge dZ^B=-dZ^B\wedge dZ^A\,.$

This field can be eliminated when solving for the Z-dependence. The bosonic projection for the $S$-field is $S_A(Y,Z|x)=-S_A(-Y,-Z|x)$ due to the additional index $A$ that is eventually carried by Y,Z.

As to avoid any confusion caused by the differential forms in the auxiliary Z-space and to reveal the relation to the deformed oscillators the Vasiliev equations are written below in the component form. The Vasiliev equations can be split into two parts. The first part contains only zero-curvature or covariant constancy equations:

$$\begin{align}
dW&=W\star W\,,\\
dB&=W\star B- B\star \pi(W)\,,\\
dS_A&=W\star S_A-S_A\star W\,,
\end{align}$$

where the higher-spin algebra automorphism $\pi$ is extended to the full algebra as

$$\begin{align}
\pi(W)(y_\alpha,y_{\dot{\alpha}},z_\alpha,z_{\dot{\alpha}})&={W}(-y_\alpha,y_{\dot{\alpha}},-z_\alpha,z_{\dot{\alpha}})={W}(y_\alpha,-y_{\dot{\alpha}},z_\alpha,-z_{\dot{\alpha}})\,,
\end{align}$$

the latter two forms being equivalent because of the bosonic projection imposed on $W(Y,Z|X)$.

Therefore, the first part of the equations implies that there is no nontrivial curvature in the x-space since $W$ is flat. The second part makes the system nontrivial and determines the curvature of the auxiliary connection $S$:

$$\begin{align}
\left[ S_A,S_B\right]_\star&=-2i\begin{bmatrix}
\epsilon_{\alpha\beta} (1+B\star \varkappa) & 0 \\
0 & \epsilon_{\dot{\alpha}\dot{\beta}}(1+B\star \bar{\varkappa})
\end{bmatrix}\,,\\
\{B\star \varkappa, S_\alpha\}_\star&=0\,, \\
\{B\star \bar{\varkappa}, S_{\dot{\alpha}}\}_\star&=0\,,
\end{align}$$

where two Klein operators were introduced

$$\varkappa=\exp{i y_\alpha z^\alpha}\,, \qquad \bar{\varkappa}=\exp{i y_{\dot{\alpha}} z^{\dot{\alpha}}}$$

The existence of the Klein operators is of utter importance for the system. They realise the $\pi$ automorphism as an inner one

$$\begin{align}
\varkappa\star f(y_\alpha,y_{\dot{\alpha}},z_\alpha,z_{\dot{\alpha}})\star \varkappa&= f(-y_\alpha,y_{\dot{\alpha}},-z_\alpha,z_{\dot{\alpha}})\,, \qquad && \varkappa\star \varkappa=1\,,\\
\bar{\varkappa}\star f(y_\alpha,y_{\dot{\alpha}},z_\alpha,z_{\dot{\alpha}})\star \bar{\varkappa}&= f(y_\alpha,-y_{\dot{\alpha}},z_\alpha,-z_{\dot{\alpha}})\,, \qquad && \bar{\varkappa}\star \bar{\varkappa}=1\,.
\end{align}$$

In other words, the Klein operator $\varkappa$ behave as $(-1)^{N_y+N_z}$, i.e. it anti-commutes to odd functions and commute to even functions in y,z.

These 3+2 equations are the Vasiliev equations for the four-dimensional bosonic higher-spin theory. Several comments are in order.

- The algebraic part of the system when split into components $A=\alpha,\dot{\alpha}; \alpha=1,2; \dot{\alpha}=1,2$ in accordance with the choice of the $sp(4)$-metric

$$C_{AB}=\begin{bmatrix}
\epsilon_{\alpha\beta} & 0 \\
0 & \epsilon_{\dot{\alpha}\dot{\beta}}
\end{bmatrix}$$
becomes equivalent to two copies of the mutually commuting deformed oscillators:
$$\begin{array}{lll}
\left[S_{{\alpha}},S_{{\beta}}\right]=-2i\epsilon_{\alpha\beta} (1+B\star \varkappa) & \left[S_{{\alpha}},S_{\dot{\beta}}\right] =0 & \{B\star \varkappa, S_\alpha\}_\star=0\\
\left[S_{\dot{\alpha}},S_{{\beta}}\right]=0 & \left[S_{\dot{\alpha}},S_{\dot{\beta}}\right]=-2i\epsilon_{\dot{\alpha}\dot{\beta}}(1+B\star \bar{\varkappa}) & \{B\star \bar{\varkappa}, S_{\dot{\alpha}}\}_\star=0
\end{array}$$
Therefore, the last two equations are equivalent to the definition relations of two copies of $osp(1|2)$ with the $S_\alpha$ and $S_{\dot{\alpha}}$ playing the role of the odd generators and with $B\star \varkappa$ and $B\star \bar{\varkappa}$ playing the role of the deformations. Since $B$ is the same for the two copies, they are not independent, which does not spoil the consistency.

- The system is consistent. The consistency of the first three equations is obvious since they are zero-curvature/covariant-constancy equations. The consistency of the last two equations is thanks to the deformed oscillators. The mutual consistency of the two parts of the equations is thanks to fact that the twisted covariant constancy of the $B$-field is equivalent to the usual covariant constancy of either $B\star \varkappa$ or $B\star \bar{\varkappa}$. Indeed,

$$d (B\star \varkappa)-[W,(B\star \varkappa)]=(dB-W\star B+B\star \varkappa \star W \star \varkappa)\star \varkappa=(dB-W\star B+ B\star \pi(W))\star \varkappa=0$$
where we used $\varkappa\star \varkappa=1$ and its relation to the $\pi$-automorphism. Then, $\varkappa$ can be cancelled since it is invertible;

- The equations are gauge invariant. The gauge symmetry transformations with $\xi=\xi(Y,Z|x)$ are:

$$\begin{align}
\delta W&= d\xi-[W,\xi]_\star\\
\delta B&=\xi\star B-B\star \pi(\xi)\\
\delta S_A&=\xi\star S_A-S_A\star \pi(\xi)
\end{align}$$

- The equations are background independent and some vacuum needs to be specified in order to give an interpretation of the linearized solution
- The simplest exact solution is the empty anti-de Sitter space:

$$W=\Omega=\frac12 \varpi^{\alpha\alpha}L_{\alpha\alpha}+ h^{\alpha\dot{\alpha}} P_{\alpha\dot{\alpha}}+\frac12 \varpi^{\dot{\alpha}\dot{\alpha}}\bar{L}_{\dot{\alpha}\dot{\alpha}}\,, \qquad B=0\,, \qquad S_A=Z_A\,,$$
where $\Omega$ is a flat connection $d\Omega=\Omega\star \Omega$ of the anti-de Sitter algebra and the components along the Lorentz and translations generators correspond to spin-connection $\varpi^{\alpha\alpha}, \varpi^{\dot{\alpha}\dot{\alpha}}$ and vierbein $h^{{\alpha}\dot{\alpha}}$, respectively. It is important that the $S$-field has a nontrivial vacuum value, which is a solution due to $[Z_A,Z_B]_\star=-2iC_{AB}$ and the fact that $B=0$.

- The Vasiliev equations linearized over the anti-de Sitter vacuum do describe all free massless fields of spin s=0,1,2,3,..., which requires some computation and is shown below.

== Linearization ==
To prove that the linearized Vasiliev equations do describe free massless higher-spin fields we need to consider the linearised fluctuations over the anti-de Sitter vacuum. First of all we take the exact solution where $W=\Omega$ is a flat connection of the anti-de Sitter algebra, $B=0$ and $S_A=Z_A$ and add fluctuations

$$W=\Omega + w\,, \qquad B=0+2ib\,, \qquad S_A=Z_A+2is_A\,.$$

Then, we linearize the Vasiliev equations

$$\begin{align}
dw-\Omega\star w-w\star\Omega&=0\,,\\
db-\Omega\star b+b\star \pi(\Omega)&=0\,,\\
ds_A-\Omega\star s_A+s_A\star \Omega&= \partial_A w\,,\\
\partial_A b&=0\,,\\
\partial_\alpha s_\beta-\partial_\beta s_\alpha &=\epsilon_{\alpha\beta}b\star \varkappa\,,\\
\partial_{\dot{\alpha}} s_{\dot{\beta}}-\partial_{\dot{\beta}} s_{\dot{\alpha}} &=\epsilon_{\dot{\alpha}\dot{\beta}}b\star \bar{\varkappa}\,,\\
\partial_\alpha s_{\dot{\beta}}-\partial_{\dot{\beta}}s_\alpha&=0 \,,
\end{align}$$

Above it was used several times that $[Z^A, f(Z)]_\star=-2i\partial_A f(Z), \partial_A\equiv\frac{\partial}{\partial Z^A}$, i.e. the vacuum value of the S-field acts as the derivative under the commutator. It is convenient to split the four-component Y,Z into two-component variables as $Y^A=(y^\alpha,y^{\dot{\alpha}}), Z^A=(z^\alpha,z^{\dot{\alpha}})$. Another trick that was used in the fourth equation is the invertibility of the Klein operators:

$$\{b\star \varkappa, z_\alpha\}=b\star \varkappa\star z_\alpha+z_\alpha\star b\star \varkappa=
(b\star \varkappa\star z_\alpha\star\varkappa+z_\alpha\star b)\star \varkappa=[z_\alpha,b]\star\varkappa\,.$$

The fifth of the Vasiliev equations is now split into the last three equation above.

The analysis of the linearized fluctuations is in solving the equations one by one in the right order. Recall that one expects to find unfolded equations for two fields: one-form $\omega=\omega_\mu(Y|x)dx^\mu$ and zero-form $C=C(Y|x)$. From the fourth equation it follows that $b$ does not depend on the auxiliary Z-direction. Therefore, one can identify $b=C(Y|x)$. The second equation then immediately leads to

$$\nabla C +ih^{\alpha\dot{\alpha}}\left(y_\alpha y_{\dot{\alpha}}-\frac{\partial^2}{\partial y^\alpha\partial y^{\dot{\alpha}}}\right)C=0\,,$$

where $\nabla$ is the Lorentz covariant derivative

$$\nabla=d-\varpi^{\alpha\beta}\left(y_\alpha\frac{\partial}{\partial y^\beta}+y_\beta\frac{\partial}{\partial y^\alpha}\right)-...$$

where ... denote the term with $\varpi^{\dot{\alpha}\dot{\beta}}$ that is similar to the first one. The Lorentz covariant derivative comes from the usual commutator action of the spin-connection part of $\Omega$. The term with the vierbein results from the $\pi$-automorphism that flips the sign of the AdS-translations and produces anti-commutator $h^{\alpha\dot{\alpha}}\left\{P_{\alpha\dot{\alpha}},\bullet\right\}_\star$.

To read off the content of the C-equation one needs to expand it in Y and analyze the C-equation component-wise

$$C=\sum_{k+m= \text{even}}C_{\alpha_1...\alpha_k,\dot{\alpha}_1...\dot{\alpha}_m}(X)\,y^{\alpha_1}...y^{\alpha_k}\,y^{\dot{\alpha}_1}...y^{\dot{\alpha}_m}$$

Then various components can be seen to have the following interpretation:

- The very first component $C(x)$ is the scalar field. The one next to it, $C_{\alpha\dot{\alpha}}$ is expressed by virtue of the C-equation as the derivative of the scalar. One of the component equations imposes the Klein–Gordon equation $(\square -2)C(x)=0$, where the cosmological constant is set to one. The components with equal number of dotted and undotted indices are expressed as on-shell derivatives of the scalar

$$C_{\alpha_1...\alpha_k,\dot{\alpha}_1...\dot{\alpha}_k}(x)\,h^{\alpha_1\dot{\alpha}_1}_{\mu_1}...h^{\alpha_k\dot{\alpha}_k}_{\mu_k}\sim \nabla_{\mu_1}...\nabla_{\mu_k}C(x)$$

- $C_{\alpha\beta}, C_{\dot{\alpha}\dot{\beta}}$ are the self-dual and anti self-dual components of the Maxwell tensor $F_{\mu\nu}$. The C-equation imposes the Maxwell equations. The components with k+2=m and k=m+2 are on-shell derivatives of the Maxwell tensor;
- $C_{\alpha\beta\gamma\delta}, C_{\dot{\alpha}\dot{\beta}\dot{\gamma}\dot{\delta}}$ are the self-dual and anti self-dual components of the Weyl tensor $C_{\mu\nu,\lambda\rho}$. The C-equation imposes the Bianchi identities for the Weyl tensor. The components with k+4=m and k=m+4 are on-shell derivatives of the Weyl tensor;
- $C_{\alpha_1...\alpha_{2s}}, C_{\dot{\alpha}_1...\dot{\alpha}_{2s}}$ are the self-dual and anti self-dual components of the higher-spin generalization of the Weyl tensor. The C-equation imposes the Bianchi identities and the components with k+2s=m and k=m+2s are on-shell derivatives of the higher-spin Weyl tensor;

The last three equations can be recognized to be the equations of the form $\mathrm{d}\mu=\nu, \mathrm{d}\nu=0$ where $\mathrm{d}$ is the exterior derivative on the space of differential forms in the Z-space. Such equations can be solved with the help of the Poincaré Lemma. In addition one needs to know how to multiply by the Klein operator from the right, which is easy to derive from the integral formula for the star-product:

$$f(y_\alpha,z_\beta)\star \varkappa=f(-z_\alpha,-y_\beta)\varkappa\,.$$

I.e. the result is to exchange the half of the Y and Z variables and to flip the sign. The solution to the last three equations can be written as

$$s_\alpha= z_\alpha \int_0^1 t\,dt\, C(-zt,\bar{y})e^{ity^\alpha z_\alpha}+\partial_\alpha \epsilon\,,$$

where a similar formula exists for $s_{\dot{\alpha}}$. Here the last term is the gauge ambiguity, i.e. the freedom to add exact forms in the Z-space, and $\epsilon=\epsilon(Y,Z|x)$. One can gauge fix it to have $\partial_\alpha\epsilon=0$. Then, one plugs the solution to the third equation, which of the same type, i.e. a differential equation of the first order in the Z-space. Its general solution is again given by the Poincaré Lemma

$$w=\omega+Z^A\int_0^1dt\, f_A(zt)\,,\qquad f_A=dS_A-[\Omega,S_A]_\star\,,$$

where $\omega=\omega(Y|x)$ is the integration constant in the Z-space, i.e. the de-Rham cohomology. It is this integration constant that is to be identified with the one-form $\omega(Y|x)$ as the name suggests. After some algebra one finds

$$w=\omega+\int_0^1dt(1-t)\left(t\varpi^{\alpha\beta}z_\alpha z_\beta-ih^{\alpha\dot{\alpha}}z_\alpha\frac{\partial}{\partial y^{\dot{\alpha}}}\right)C(-z_\gamma t,y_{\dot{\gamma}})e^{ity^\delta z_\delta}+...$$

where we again dropped a term with dotted and undotted indices exchanged. The last step is to plug the solution into the first equation to find

$$\nabla \omega -h^{\alpha\dot{\alpha}}\left(y_\alpha\frac{\partial}{\partial y^{\dot{\alpha}}}+y_{\dot{\alpha}}\frac{\partial}{\partial y^\alpha}\right)\omega=-\frac{1}{2} h_\gamma{}^{\dot{\alpha}}\wedge h^{\gamma\dot{\beta}}\frac{\partial^2}{\partial y^{\dot{\alpha}} \partial y^{\dot{\beta}}}C(0,y_{\dot{\delta}})+...$$

and again the second term on the right is omitted. It is important that $\omega$ is not a flat connection, while $w$ is a flat connection. To analyze the $\omega$-equations it is useful to expand $\omega$ in Y

$$\omega=\sum_{k+m= \text{even}}\omega_{\alpha_1...\alpha_k,\dot{\alpha}_1...\dot{\alpha}_m}(X)\,y^{\alpha_1}...y^{\alpha_k}\,y^{\dot{\alpha}_1}...y^{\dot{\alpha}_m}$$

The content of the $\omega$-equation is as follows:

- The diagonal components with k=m are the higher-spin vierbeins, whose totally-symmetric component can be identified with the Fronsdal field as

$$h_{\mu_1}^{\alpha_1\dot{\alpha}_1}... h_{\mu_{s-1}}^{\alpha_{s-1}\dot{\alpha}_{s-1}}\,\omega_{\mu_s|\alpha_1...\alpha_{s-1},\dot{\alpha}_1...\dot{\alpha}_{s-1}}\sim \Phi_{\mu_1...\mu_s}$$
where the symmetrization on the left is implied;

- The $\omega$-equation can be shown to impose the Fronsdal equations for s=2,3,4,... . The Maxwell equations and the Klein–Gordon equations for the s=1 and s=0 components of the multiplet are in the C-equation;
- Other components are expressed as on-shell derivatives of the Fronsdal field;
- The order-s derivative of the Fronsdal field with the symmetry of the higher-spin Weyl tensor determines the corresponding component of the C-field via the right-hand side of the $\omega$-equation.

To conclude, anti-de Sitter space is an exact solution of the Vasiliev equations and upon linearization over it one finds unfolded equations that are equivalent to the Fronsdal equations for fields with s=0,1,2,3,... .

== Other dimensions, extensions, and generalisations ==
- there is an important option to introduce a free parameter in the four-dimensional equations, which is related to the parity breaking. The only modifications needed are

$$\begin{array}{ll}
\left[S_{{\alpha}},S_{{\beta}}\right]=-2i\epsilon_{\alpha\beta} (1+e^{i\theta}B\star \varkappa) & \left[S_{\dot{\alpha}},S_{\dot{\beta}}\right]=-2i\epsilon_{\dot{\alpha}\dot{\beta}}(1+e^{-i\theta} B\star \bar{\varkappa})
\end{array}$$
This free parameter plays in important role in the higher-spin AdS/CFT correspondence. The theory at $\theta=0,\pi/2$ is parity invariant;
One can also take $\theta$ to be any even function $\theta(x)=\theta(-x)$ of $B\star \varkappa$ in the first equation above and of $B\star \bar{\varkappa}$ in the second one, which does not destroy the consistency of the equations.

- one can introduce Yang–Mills groups by letting the fields take values in the tensor product of the Y-Z algebra with the matrix algebra and then imposing truncations as to get $o(N),u(N), usp(N)$;
- the four-dimensional equations reviewed above can be extended with super-symmetries. One needs to extend the Y-Z algebra with additional Clifford-like elements

$$\left\{\xi_i,\xi_j\right\}=2\delta_{ij}$$

so that the fields are now function of $Y,Z,\xi$ and space-time coordinates. The components of the fields are required to have the right spin-statistic. The equations need to be slightly modified.

There also exist Vasiliev's equations in other dimensions:

- in three dimensions there is the minimal higher-spin theory and its development, known as Prokushkin–Vasiliev theory, that is based on a one-parameter family of higher-spin algebras (usually the family is denoted as $hs(\lambda)$) and also allows for super-symmetric extensions;
- there exist Vasiliev equations that operate in any space-time dimension. The spectrum of the theory consists of all the fields with integer (or even only) spins.

The equations are very similar to the four-dimensional ones, but there are some important modifications in the definition of the algebra that the fields take values in and there are further constraints in the d-dimensional case.

== Discrepancies between Vasiliev equations and Higher Spin Theories ==
There is a number of flaws/features of the Vasiliev equations that have been revealed over the last years. First of all, classical equations of motion, e.g. the Vasiliev equations, do not allow one to address the problems that require an action, the most basic one being quantization. Secondly, there are discrepancies between the results obtained from the Vasiliev equations and those from the other formulations of higher spin theories, from the AdS/CFT correspondence or from general field theory perspective. Most of the discrepancies can be attributed to the assumptions used in the derivation of the equations: gauge invariance is manifest, but locality was not properly imposed and the Vasiliev equations are a solution of a certain formal deformation problem. Practically speaking, it is not known in general how to extract the interaction vertices of the higher spin theory out of the equations.

Most of the studies concern with the four-dimensional Vasiliev equations. The correction to the free spin-2 equations due to the scalar field stress-tensor was extracted out of the four-dimensional Vasiliev equations and found to be

$$G_{\mu\nu}+\Lambda g_{\mu\nu}= Re(b_1^2)\left[ \sum_k \left( \xi_k g_{\mu\nu} \nabla_{\rho(k+1)}\phi \nabla^{\rho(k+1)}\phi + \eta_k \nabla_{\mu\rho(k)}\phi \nabla^{\rho(k)}{}_{\nu}\phi+\zeta_k\nabla_{\mu\nu\rho(k)}\phi \nabla^{\rho(k)}\phi\right)-\frac49 g_{\mu\nu} \phi^2\right]$$

where $\nabla_{\rho(k)}\phi = '\nabla_{\rho_1}...\nabla_{\rho_k}\phi +\text{symmetrization}-\text{traces}'$ are symmetrized derivatives with traces subtracted. The most important information is in the coefficients $\xi_k, \eta_k, \zeta_k$ and in the prefactor $Re(b_1^2)$, where $b_1=\exp[i\theta]$ is a free parameter that the equations have, see Other dimensions, extensions, and generalisations. The usual stress-tensor has no more than two derivative and the terms $k>0$ are not independent (for example, they contribute to the same $\langle T_{ab} j_0j_0\rangle$ AdS/CFT three-point function). This is a general property of field theories that one can perform nonlinear (and also higher derivative) field redefinitions and therefore there exist infinitely many ways to write the same interaction vertex at the classical level. The canonical stress-tensor has two derivatives and the terms with contracted derivatives can be related to it via such redefinitions.

A surprising fact that had been noticed before its inconsistency with the AdS/CFT was realized is that the stress-tensor can change sign and, in particular, vanishes for $\theta=\pi/4$. This would imply that the corresponding correlation function in the Chern-Simons matter theories vanishes, $\langle T_{ab} j_0j_0\rangle=0$, which is not the case.

The most important and detailed tests were performed much later. It was first shown that some of the three-point AdS/CFT functions, as obtained from the Vasiliev equations, turn out to be infinite or inconsistent with AdS/CFT, while some other do agree. Those that agree, in the language of Unfolded equations correspond to $\omega\star C-C\star \pi(\omega)$ and the infinities/inconsistencies resulted from $\mathcal{V}(\omega,C,C)$. The terms of the first type are local and are fixed by the higher spin algebra. The terms of the second type can be non-local (when solved perturbatively the master field $C$ is a generating functions of infinitely many derivatives of higher spin fields). These non-localities are not present in higher spin theories as can be seen from the explicit cubic action.

Further infinities, non-localities or missing structures were observed. Some of these tests explore the extension of the Klebanov–Polyakov Conjecture to Chern–Simons matter theories where the structure of correlation functions is more intricate and certain parity-odd terms are present. Some of these structures were not reproduced by the Vasiliev equations. General analysis of the Vasiliev equations at the second order showed that for any three fixed spins the interaction term is an infinite series in derivatives (similar to $k$-sum above); all of the terms in the series contribute to the same AdS/CFT three-point function and the contribution is infinite. All the problems can be attributed to the assumptions used in the derivation of the Vasiliev equations: restrictions on the number of derivatives in the interaction vertices or, more generally, locality was not imposed, which is important for getting meaningful interaction vertices, see e.g. Noether Procedure. The problem how to impose locality and extract interaction vertices out of the equations is now under active investigation.

As is briefly mentioned in Other dimensions, extensions, and generalisations there is an option to introduce infinitely many additional coupling constants that enter via phase factor $\theta(x)=\theta_0 +\theta_2 x^2+...$. As was noted, the second such coefficient $\theta_2$ will affect five-point AdS/CFT correlation functions, but not the three-point ones, which seems to be in tension with the results obtained directly from imposing higher spin symmetry on the correlation functions. Later, it was shown that the terms in the equations that result from $\theta_{2,4,...}$ are too non-local and lead to an infinite result for the AdS/CFT correlation functions.

In three dimensions the Prokushkin–Vasiliev equations, which are supposed to describe interactions of matter fields with higher spin fields in three dimensions, are also affected by the aforementioned locality problem. For example, the perturbative corrections at the second order to the stress-tensors of the matter fields lead to infinite correlation functions. There is, however, another discrepancy: the spectrum of the Prokushkin–Vasiliev equations has, in addition to the matter fields (scalar and spinor) and higher spin fields, a set of unphysical fields that do not have any field theory interpretation, but interact with the physical fields.

== Exact solutions ==
Since the Vasiliev equations are quite complicated there are few exact solutions known

- as it was already shown, there is an important solution --- empty anti-de Sitter space, whose existence allows to interpret the linearized fluctuations as massless fields of all spins;
- in three dimensions to find anti-de Sitter space as an exact solution for all values of the parameter $\lambda$ turns out to be a nontrivial problem, but it is known;
- there is a domain-wall type solution of the four-dimensional equations;
- there is a family of the solutions to the four-dimensional equations that are interpreted as black holes, although the metric transforms under the higher-spin transformations and for that reason it is difficult to rely on the usual definition of the horizon etc.;
- in the case of three-dimensions there is a consistent truncation that decouples the scalar field from the higher-spin fields, the latter being described by the Chern–Simons theory. In this case any flat connection of the higher-spin algebra is an exact solution and there has been a lot of works on this subclass;

== See also ==
- AdS/CFT correspondence#Higher spin gauge theories
- Einstein field equations
- Cartan formalism (physics)
- Spin connection
- Dirac equation in curved spacetime
- Gauged supergravity
- Supergravity
- Yang–Mills theory
