= Thomas Curtright =

American theoretical physicist

- Born: 1948 (age 77–78) near Paris, Missouri
- Education: University of Missouri; Caltech
- Known for: Curtright field
- Scientific career
- Doctoral advisor: Richard Feynman

Thomas L. Curtright (born 1948) is a theoretical physicist at the University of Miami. He did undergraduate work in physics at the University of Missouri (B.S., M.S., 1970), and graduate work at Caltech (Ph.D., 1977) under the supervision of Richard Feynman.

He has made numerous influential contributions in particle and mathematical physics, notably in supercurrent anomalies, higher-spin fields (Curtright field), quantum Liouville theory, geometrostatic sigma models, quantum algebras, and deformation quantization.

Curtright is a Fellow of the American Physical Society (1998), a co-recipient (with Charles Thorn) of the SESAPS Jesse W. Beams Award (2005), a recipient of the SESAPS Francis G. Slack Award (2024), a University of Miami Cooper Fellow (2008), and a recipient of the Distinguished Faculty Scholar Award from the University's Senate (2008). He is also the recipient of Distinguished Alumni Awards from the Department of Physics and Astronomy (2021) and from the College of Arts and Science (2022), University of Missouri at Columbia.

He has co-edited and co-authored several books, notably on quantum mechanics in phase space.
