= Émile Cotton =

French mathematician (1872–1950)

Émile Clément Cotton (5 February 1872 – 14 March 1950) was a professor of mathematics at the University of Grenoble. His PhD thesis studied differential geometry in three dimensions, with the introduction of the Cotton tensor. He held the professorship from 1904 until his 1942 retirement.

He was awarded the Legion of Honor.

His brother was Aimé Cotton; their father was a mathematics professor.

== Publications ==
- Cours de mécanique générale. Introduction à l'étude de la mécanique industrielle (1920)
