= Polar action =

Mathematical concept in differential geometry

In mathematics, a polar action is a proper and isometric action of a Lie group G on a complete Riemannian manifold M for which there exists a complete submanifold Σ that meets all the orbits and meets them always orthogonally; such a submanifold is called a section. A section is necessarily totally geodesic. If the sections of a polar action are flat with respect to the induced metric, then the action is called hyperpolar.

In the case of linear orthogonal actions on Euclidean spaces, polar actions are called polar representations. The isotropy representations of Riemannian symmetric spaces are basic examples of polar representations. Conversely, Dadok has classified polar representations of compact Lie groups on Euclidean spaces, and it follows from his classification that such a representation has the same orbits as the isotropy representation of a symmetric space.
