= Jerzy Plebański =

Polish physicist

- Born: May 7, 1928; Warsaw, Poland
- Died: August 24, 2005 (aged 77); Mexico
- Education: University of Warsaw
- Known for: Plebanski action Plebanski tensor other work in general relativity and non-linear electrodynamics
- Scientific career
- Fields: physics
- Workplaces: University of Warsaw; CINVESTAV
- Doctoral advisor: Wojciech Rubinowicz

Jerzy Franciszek Plebański (7 May 1928, Warsaw – 24 August 2005, Mexico) was a Polish theoretical physicist best known for his extensive research into general relativity and supergravity.

== Biography ==
In 1954, Plebański received his Ph.D. under the direction of Wojciech Rubinowicz at the University of Warsaw. He then went to work at the newly founded Institute of Theoretical Physics of the University of Warsaw. A specialist in the field of general relativity and mathematical physics, his first book with co-author Leopold Infeld was on the problem of motion in general relativity. He was Vice-Dean of the Faculty of Mathematics and Physics at the University of Warsaw from 1958 to 1962.

In 1958 Plebański traveled to the United States, and spent two years there, first as an invited professor at the Institute for Advanced Study in Princeton, and then at UCLA in Los Angeles. The year after his return to Poland in 1960, he married Anna Lazarowicz.

From 1962 to 1967 the Plebańskis were in Mexico. In the Cold War years, Mexico was a neutral country, and their visit was approved by the Polish authorities. Jerzy was invited by Arturo Rosenblueth to join the physics department of the Center for Research and Advanced Studies [Centro de Investigaciones y de Estudios Avanzados] of the National Polytechnic Institute—normally referred to by its initials CINVESTAV—in Mexico City.

Returning to Poland, Plebański was vice-rector of the University of Warsaw from 1969 to 1973.

The Plebańskis emigrated permanently to Mexico in 1973. Jerzy returned to the Center for Research and Advanced Studies, where he remained until his death in 2005. During his stay in Mexico he hosted many Polish physicists and maintained close contacts with the University of Warsaw.

== Scientific work ==
1. Nonlinear electrodynamics and quantization techniques.

2. Relativistic equations of motion: "fast approximation"

3. Spinor connections

4. Plebanski tensor

5. Plebanski action. All vacuum and self-dual solutions of the Einstein equations satisfy a single equation, called the "Heavenly equation".

== See also ==
- Plebanski action
- Plebanski tensor
- Contributors to general relativity
