= Hantzsche–Wendt manifold =

Closed flat 3-manifold

The Hantzsche–Wendt manifold, also known as the HW manifold or didicosm, is a compact, orientable, flat 3-manifold, first studied by Walter Hantzsche and Hilmar Wendt in 1934. It is the only closed flat 3-manifold with first Betti number zero. Its holonomy group is $\mathbb{Z}_2^2$. It has been suggested as a possible shape of the universe because its complicated topology can obscure the features in the cosmic microwave background that would arise if the universe is a closed flat manifold, such as the 3-torus.

== Construction ==
The Hantzsche–Wendt manifold is made from two cubes stacked on top of each other by gluing the identically-marked faces such that the markings line up.

The HW manifold can be built from two cubes that share a face. One construction proceeds as follows:

1. The top and bottom faces are glued to one another.
2. One of the remaining sides is glued to the opposite side with a 180° rotation.
3. One of the remaining faces on the top cube is glued to the matching face of the bottom cube, reflected across an axis parallel to the long axis of the double-cube.
4. Repeat step 3 for the remaining pair of faces.

== Generalizations ==
In addition to the orientable one (the Hantzsche–Wendt manifold), there are two non-orientable flat 3-manifolds with holonomy group $\mathbb{Z}_2^2$, known as the first and second amphidicosms, both with first Betti number 1.

Similar flat n-dimensional manifolds with holonomy $\mathbb{Z}_2^{n-1}$, known as generalized Hantzsche–Wendt manifolds, may be constructed for any n≥2, but orientable ones exist only in odd dimensions. The number of orientable HW manifolds up to diffeomorphism increases exponentially with dimension. All of these have first Betti number β_{1} 0 or 1.

Number of generalized HW manifolds by dimension
Dimension	Total ((sequence A124153 in the OEIS))	Orientable	Non-orientable	β_{1} = 0	β_{1} = 1
2	1	0	1	0	1
3	3	1	2	1	2
4	12	0	12	2	10
5	123	2	121	23	100
6	2536	0	2536	352	2184
