= Plebanski tensor =

Order 4 tensor

The Plebanski tensor is an order 4 tensor in general relativity constructed from the trace-free Ricci tensor. It was first defined by Jerzy Plebański in 1964.

Let $S_{ab}$ be the trace-free Ricci tensor:

$$S_{ab}=R_{ab}-\frac{1}{4}Rg_{ab}.$$

Then the Plebanski tensor is defined as

$$P^{ab}{}_{cd}=S^{[a}{}_{[c}S^{b]}{}_{d]}+\delta^{[a}{}_{[c}S^{b]e}S_{d]e}-\frac{1}{6}\delta^{[a}{}_{[c}\delta^{b]}{}_{d]}S^{ef}S_{ef}.$$

The advantage of the Plebanski tensor is that it shares the same symmetries as the Weyl tensor. It therefore becomes possible to classify different spacetimes based on additional algebraic symmetries of the Plebanski tensor in a manner analogous to the Petrov classification.
