= Curtright field =

Tensor quantum field of mixed symmetry

In theoretical physics, the Curtright field (named after Thomas Curtright) is a tensor quantum field of mixed symmetry, whose gauge-invariant dynamics are dual to those of the general relativistic graviton in higher (D>4) spacetime dimensions. Or at least this holds for the linearized theory. For the full nonlinear theory, less is known. Several difficulties arise when interactions of mixed symmetry fields are considered, but at least in situations involving an infinite number of such fields (notably string theory) these difficulties are not insurmountable.

The Lanczos tensor has a gauge-transformation dynamics similar to that of Curtright. But Lanczos tensor exists only in 4D.

== Overview ==
In four spacetime dimensions, the field is not dual to the graviton, if massless, but it can be used to describe massive, pure spin 2 quanta. Similar descriptions exist for other massive higher spins, in D≥4.

The simplest example of the linearized theory is given by a rank three Lorentz tensor $T_{\alpha\beta\mu}$, whose indices carry the permutation symmetry of the Young diagram corresponding to the integer partition 3=2+1. That is to say, $T_{\alpha\beta\mu}=T_{[\alpha\beta]\mu}$ and $T_{[\alpha\beta\mu]}=0$, where indices in square brackets are totally antisymmetrized. The corresponding field strength for $T_{\alpha\beta\mu}$ is $F_{\alpha\beta\gamma\mu}=3\partial_{[\gamma}T_{\alpha\beta]\mu}.$ This has a nontrivial trace $F_{\alpha\beta}=\eta^{\gamma\mu}F_{\alpha\beta\gamma\mu}$, where $\eta^{\gamma\mu}$ is the Minkowski metric with signature (+,−,−,...)

The action for $T_{\alpha\beta\mu}$ in D spacetime dimensions is bilinear in the field strength and its trace:

$$S=-\frac{1}{6} \int d^{D}x (F_{\alpha\beta\gamma\mu}F^{\alpha\beta\gamma\mu}-3F_{\alpha\beta}F^{\alpha\beta}).$$

This action is gauge invariant, assuming there is zero net contribution from any boundaries, while the field strength itself is not. The gauge transformation in question is given by

$$\delta T_{\alpha\beta\mu}=\partial_{[\alpha}S_{\beta]\mu}+\partial_{[\alpha}A_{\beta]\mu}-\partial_{\mu}A_{\alpha\beta}$$,

where S and A are arbitrary symmetric and antisymmetric tensors, respectively. This is the first level of the gauge redundancy; in fact, there exist transformations of the parameters that leave the field configuration unchanged: these are called gauge-for-gauge transformations and are typical of exotic gauge theories in which $p$-form or mixed-symmetry fields appear.

In 2026, the asymptotic charges of the Curtright field were calculated in arbitrary dimension and related in $D=5$ to the asymptotic charges of the graviton. In this dimension, the algebra of the Curtright asymptotic charges closes in three sectors: a scalar sector parameterized by a superstranslation-like parameter, a vector sector parameterized by Killing vectors of the 3-sphere and a TT (transverse-traceless) sector. The algebra closely resembles the graviton's BMS algebra with a higher-spin-like superstranslation sector.

An infinite family of mixed symmetry gauge fields arises, formally, in the zero tension limit of string theory, especially if D>4. Such mixed symmetry fields can also be used to provide alternate local descriptions for massive particles, either in the context of strings with nonzero tension, or else for individual particle quanta without reference to string theory.

== See also ==
- Kalb–Ramond field
- p-form electrodynamics
- dual graviton
- Massive gravity
- Montonen-Olive duality
