= Flat manifold =

Manifold that "locally looks like" Euclidean space

In mathematics, a Riemannian manifold is said to be flat if its Riemann curvature tensor is everywhere zero. Intuitively, a flat manifold is one that "locally looks like" Euclidean space in terms of distances and angles, e.g. the interior angles of a triangle add up to 180°.

The universal cover of a complete flat manifold is Euclidean space. This can be used to prove the theorem of Bieberbach (1911, 1912) that all compact flat manifolds are finitely covered by tori; the 3-dimensional case was proved earlier by Schoenflies (1891).

== Examples ==
The following manifolds can be endowed with a flat metric. Note that this may not be their 'standard' metric (for example, the flat metric on the 2-dimensional torus is not the metric induced by its usual embedding into $\mathbb{R}^3$).

=== Dimension 1 ===
Every one-dimensional Riemannian manifold is flat. Conversely, given that every connected one-dimensional smooth manifold is diffeomorphic to either $\mathbb{R}$ or $S^1,$ it is straightforward to see that every connected one-dimensional Riemannian manifold is isometric to one of the following (each with their standard Riemannian structure):

- the real line
- the finite open interval $(0,x)$ for some number $x>0$
- the infinite open interval $(0,\infty)$
- the circle $\{(x,y)\in \mathbb{R}^2:x^2+y^2=r^2\}$ of radius $r,$ for some number $r>0.$

Only the first and last are complete. If one includes Riemannian manifolds-with-boundary, then the half-open and closed intervals must also be included.

The simplicity of a complete description in this case could be ascribed to the fact that every one-dimensional Riemannian manifold has a smooth unit-length vector field, and that an isometry from one of the above model examples is provided by considering an integral curve.

=== Dimension 2 ===
==== The five possibilities, up to diffeomorphism ====
If $(M,g)$ is a smooth two-dimensional connected complete flat Riemannian manifold, then $M$ must be diffeomorphic to one of

- $\mathbb{R}^2$ (the infinite plane)
- $S^1\times\mathbb{R}$ (the infinite cylinder)
- $S^1\times S^1$ (the torus)
- the Möbius strip
- the Klein bottle.

The only compact possibilities are $S^1\times S^1$ and the Klein bottle, while the only orientable possibilities are $\mathbb{R}^2,$ $S^1\times \mathbb{R},$ and $S^1\times S^1.$

It takes more effort to describe the distinct complete flat Riemannian metrics on these spaces. For instance, the two factors of $S^1\times S^1$ can have any two real numbers as their radii. These metrics are distinguished from each other by the ratio of their two radii, so this space has infinitely many different flat product metrics which are not isometric up to a scale factor. In order to talk uniformly about the five possibilities, and in particular to work concretely with the Möbius strip and the Klein bottle as abstract manifolds, it is useful to use the language of group actions.

==== The five possibilities, up to isometry ====
Given $(x_0,y_0)\in\mathbb{R}^2,$ let $T_{(x_0,y_0)}$ denote the translation $\mathbb{R}^2\to\mathbb{R}^2$ given by $(x,y)\mapsto(x+x_0,y+y_0).$ Let $R$ denote the reflection $\mathbb{R}^2\to\mathbb{R}^2$ given by $(x,y)\mapsto(x,-y).$ Given two positive numbers $a,b,$ consider the following subgroups of $\operatorname{Isom}(\mathbb{R}^2),$ the group of isometries of $\mathbb{R}^2$ with its standard metric.

- $G_{e}=\{T_{(0,0)}\}$
- $G_{\text{cyl}}(a)=\{T_{(an,0)}:n\in\mathbb{Z}\}$
- $G_{\text{tor}}(a,b)=\{T_{(na,mb)}:m,n\in\mathbb{Z}\}$ provided $a<b.$
- $G_{\text{Moeb}}(a)=\{T_{(2na,0)}:n\in\mathbb{Z}\}\cup\{T_{((2n+1)a,0)}\circ R:n\in\mathbb{Z}\}$
- $G_{\text{KB}}(b)=\{T_{(2na,bm)}:n,m\in\mathbb{Z}\}\cup\{T_{((2n+1)a,bm)}\circ R:n,m\in\mathbb{Z}\}$

These are all groups acting freely and properly discontinuously on $\mathbb{R}^2,$ and so the various coset spaces $\mathbb{R}^2/G$ all naturally have the structure of two-dimensional complete flat Riemannian manifolds. None of them are isometric to one another, and any smooth two-dimensional complete flat connected Riemannian manifold is isometric to one of them.

==== Orbifolds ====
There are 17 compact 2-dimensional orbifolds with flat metric (including the torus and Klein bottle), listed in the article on orbifolds, that correspond to the 17 wallpaper groups.

==== Remarks ====
Note that the standard 'picture' of the torus as a doughnut does not present it with a flat metric, since the points furthest from the center have positive curvature while the points closest to the center have negative curvature. According to Kuiper's formulation of the Nash embedding theorem, there is a $C^1$ embedding $S^1\times S^1\to\mathbb{R}^3$ which induces any of the flat product metrics which exist on $S^1\times S^1,$ but these are not easily visualizable. Since $S^1$ is presented as an embedded submanifold of $\mathbb{R}^2,$ any of the (flat) product structures on $S^1\times S^1$ are naturally presented as submanifolds of $\mathbb{R}^2\times\mathbb{R}^2=\mathbb{R}^4.$ Likewise, the standard three-dimensional visualizations of the Klein bottle do not present a flat metric. The standard construction of a Möbius strip, by gluing ends of a strip of paper together, does indeed give it a flat metric, but it is not complete.

=== Dimension 3 ===
There are 6 orientable and 4 non-orientable compact flat 3-manifolds, which are all Seifert fiber spaces; they are the quotient groups of $\mathbb{R}^3$ by the 10 torsion-free crystallographic groups. There are also 4 orientable and 4 non-orientable non-compact spaces.

==== Orientable ====
The 10 orientable flat 3-manifolds are:

1. Euclidean 3-space, $\mathbb{R}^3$.
2. The 3-torus $T^3$, made by gluing opposite faces of a cube.
3. The manifold made by gluing opposite faces of a cube with a 1/2 twist on one pair.
4. The manifold made by gluing opposite faces of a cube with a 1/4 twist on one pair.
5. The manifold made by gluing opposite faces of a hexagonal prism with a 1/3 twist on the hexagonal faces.
6. The manifold made by gluing opposite faces of a hexagonal prism with a 1/6 twist on the hexagonal faces.
7. The Hantzsche–Wendt manifold.
8. The manifold $S^1 \times \mathbb{R}^2$ made as the space between two parallel planes that are glued together.
9. The manifold $T^2 \times \mathbb{R}$ made by gluing opposite walls of an infinite square column.
10. The manifold made by gluing opposite walls of an infinite square column with a 1/2 twist on one pair.

==== Non-orientable ====
The 8 non-orientable 3-manifolds are:

1. The Cartesian product of a circle and a Klein bottle, $S^1 \times K$.
2. A manifold similar to the aforementioned, but translationally offset in one direction parallel to the glide plane; moving in this direction returns to the opposite side of the manifold.
3. The manifold made by reflecting a point across two perpendicular glide planes and translating along the third direction.
4. A manifold similar to the aforementioned, but translationally offset in one direction parallel to one glide plane; moving in this direction returns to the opposite side of the manifold.
5. The Cartesian product of a circle and an (unbounded) Möbius strip.
6. The manifold $K \times \mathbb{R}$ made by translating a point along one axis and reflecting it across a perpendicular glide plane.
7. The manifold made by translating a point along one axis and reflecting it across a parallel glide plane.
8. The manifold made by reflecting a point across two perpendicular glide planes.

=== Higher dimensions ===
- Euclidean space
- Tori
- Products of flat manifolds
- Quotients of flat manifolds by groups acting freely.

== Relation to amenability ==
Among all closed manifolds with non-positive sectional curvature, flat manifolds are characterized as precisely those with an amenable fundamental group.

This is a consequence of the Adams-Ballmann theorem (1998), which establishes this characterization in the much more general setting of discrete cocompact groups of isometries of Hadamard spaces. This provides a far-reaching generalisation of Bieberbach's theorem.

The discreteness assumption is essential in the Adams-Ballmann theorem: otherwise, the classification must include symmetric spaces, Bruhat-Tits buildings and Bass-Serre trees in view of the "indiscrete" Bieberbach theorem of Caprace-Monod.

== See also ==
- Space forms
- Space group
- Ricci-flat manifold
- Conformally flat manifold
- Affine manifold
