= Cotton tensor =

In differential geometry, the Cotton tensor on a pseudo-Riemannian manifold of dimension n is a third-order tensor concomitant of the metric tensor. The vanishing of the Cotton tensor for n = 3 is necessary and sufficient condition for the manifold to be locally conformally flat. By contrast, in dimensions n ≥ 4, the vanishing of the Cotton tensor is necessary but not sufficient for the metric to be conformally flat; instead, the corresponding necessary and sufficient condition in these higher dimensions is the vanishing of the Weyl tensor, while the Cotton tensor just becomes a constant times the divergence of the Weyl tensor. For n < 3 the Cotton tensor is identically zero. The concept is named after Émile Cotton.

The proof of the classical result that for n = 3 the vanishing of the Cotton tensor is equivalent to the metric being conformally flat is given by Eisenhart using a standard integrability argument. This tensor density is uniquely characterized by its conformal properties coupled with the demand that it be differentiable for arbitrary metric tensors, as shown by Aldersley (1979). The Cotton tensor is a component of the full Cartan conformal curvature in all dimensions $n>2$, the other component being the Weyl curvature.

Recently, the study of three-dimensional spaces is becoming of great interest, because the Cotton tensor restricts the relation between the Ricci tensor and the energy–momentum tensor in the Einstein equations and plays an important role in the Hamiltonian formalism of general relativity.

== Definition ==
In coordinates, and denoting the Ricci tensor by R_{ij} and the scalar curvature by R, the components of the Cotton tensor are

$$C_{ijk} = \nabla_{k} R_{ij} - \nabla_{j} R_{ik} + \frac{1}{2(n-1)}\left( \nabla_{j}Rg_{ik} -  \nabla_{k}Rg_{ij}\right).$$

The Cotton tensor can be regarded as a vector valued 2-form, and for n = 3 the Hodge star operator converts this into a second-order trace-free tensor density:

$$C_i^j = \nabla_{k} \left( R_{li} - \frac{1}{4} Rg_{li}\right)\epsilon^{klj},$$

sometimes called the Cotton–York tensor.

== Properties ==
=== Conformal rescaling ===
Under conformal rescaling of the metric $\tilde{g} = e^{2\omega} g$ for some scalar function $\omega$, we see that the Christoffel symbols transform as

$$\widetilde{\Gamma}^{\alpha}_{\beta\gamma}=\Gamma^{\alpha}_{\beta\gamma}+S^{\alpha}_{\beta\gamma}$$

where $S^{\alpha}_{\beta\gamma}$ is the tensor

$$S^{\alpha}_{\beta\gamma} = \delta^{\alpha}_{\gamma} \partial_{\beta} \omega + \delta^{\alpha}_{\beta} \partial_{\gamma} \omega - g_{\beta\gamma} \partial^{\alpha} \omega$$

The Riemann curvature tensor transforms as

$${\widetilde{R}^{\lambda}}{}_{\mu\alpha\beta}={R^{\lambda}}_{\mu\alpha\beta}+\nabla_{\alpha}S^{\lambda}_{\beta\mu}-\nabla_{\beta}S^{\lambda}_{\alpha\mu}+S^{\lambda}_{\alpha\rho}S^{\rho}_{\beta\mu}-S^{\lambda}_{\beta\rho}S^{\rho}_{\alpha\mu}$$

In $n$-dimensional manifolds, we obtain the Ricci tensor by contracting the transformed Riemann tensor to see it transform as

$$\widetilde{R}_{\beta\mu}=R_{\beta\mu}-g_{\beta\mu}\nabla^{\alpha}\partial_{\alpha}\omega-(n-2)\nabla_{\mu}\partial_{\beta}\omega+(n-2)(\partial_{\mu}\omega\partial_{\beta}\omega-g_{\beta\mu}\partial^{\lambda}\omega\partial_{\lambda}\omega)$$

Similarly the Ricci scalar transforms as

$$\widetilde{R}=e^{-2\omega}R-2e^{-2\omega}(n-1)\nabla^{\alpha}\partial_{\alpha}\omega-(n-2)(n-1)e^{-2\omega}\partial^{\lambda}\omega\partial_{\lambda}\omega$$

Combining all these facts together permits us to conclude the Cotton–York tensor transforms as

$$\widetilde{C}_{\alpha\beta\gamma}=C_{\alpha\beta\gamma}+(n-2)\partial_{\lambda}\omega {W_{\beta\gamma\alpha}}^{\lambda}$$

or using coordinate independent language as

$$\tilde{C} = C \; + (n-2) \; \operatorname{grad} \, \omega \; \lrcorner \; W,$$

where the gradient is contracted with the Weyl tensor W.

=== Symmetries ===
The Cotton tensor has the following symmetries:

$$C_{ijk} = -C_{ikj}$$

and therefore

$$C_{[ijk]} = 0.$$

In addition the Bianchi formula for the Weyl tensor can be rewritten as

$$\delta W = (3-n) C,$$

where $\delta$ is the positive divergence in the first component of W.

== See also ==
- Weyl–Schouten theorem
- Schouten tensor
- Chern–Simons theory § Chern–Simons gravity theory
