= Weyl tensor =

Measure of the curvature of a pseudo-Riemannian manifold

In differential geometry, the Weyl curvature tensor, named after Hermann Weyl, is a measure of the curvature of spacetime or, more generally, a pseudo-Riemannian manifold. Like the Riemann curvature tensor, the Weyl tensor expresses the tidal force that a body feels when moving along a geodesic. The Weyl tensor differs from the Riemann curvature tensor in that it does not convey information on how the volume of the body changes, but rather only how the shape of the body is distorted by the tidal force. The Ricci curvature, or trace component of the Riemann tensor contains precisely the information about how volumes change in the presence of tidal forces, so the Weyl tensor is the traceless component of the Riemann tensor. This tensor has the same symmetries as the Riemann tensor, but satisfies the extra condition that it is trace-free: metric contraction on any pair of indices yields zero. It is obtained from the Riemann tensor by subtracting a tensor that is a linear expression in the Ricci tensor.

In general relativity, the Weyl curvature is the only part of the curvature that exists in free space—a solution of the vacuum Einstein equation—and it governs the propagation of gravitational waves through regions of space devoid of matter. More generally, the Weyl curvature is the only component of curvature for Ricci-flat manifolds and always governs the characteristics of the field equations of an Einstein manifold.

In dimensions 2 and 3 the Weyl curvature tensor vanishes identically. In dimensions ≥ 4, the Weyl curvature is generally nonzero. If the Weyl tensor vanishes in dimension ≥ 4, then the metric is locally conformally flat: there exists a local coordinate system in which the metric tensor is proportional to a constant tensor. This fact was a key component of Nordström's theory of gravitation, which was a precursor of general relativity.

== Definition ==
The Weyl tensor can be obtained from the full curvature tensor by subtracting out various traces. This is most easily done by writing the Riemann tensor as a (0,4) valence tensor (by contracting with the metric). The (0,4) valence Weyl tensor is then (Petersen 2006, p. 92)

$$C = R - \frac{1}{n-2}\left(\mathrm{Ric} - \frac{s}{n}g\right) {~\wedge\!\!\!\!\!\!\!\!\;\bigcirc~} g - \frac{s}{2n(n - 1)}g {~\wedge\!\!\!\!\!\!\!\!\;\bigcirc~} g$$

where n is the dimension of the manifold, g is the metric, R is the Riemann tensor, Ric is the Ricci tensor, s is the scalar curvature, and $h {~\wedge\!\!\!\!\!\!\!\!\;\bigcirc~} k$ denotes the Kulkarni–Nomizu product of two symmetric (0,2) tensors:

$$\begin{align}
(h {~\wedge\!\!\!\!\!\!\!\!\;\bigcirc~} k)\left(v_1, v_2, v_3, v_4\right) =\quad
&h\left(v_1, v_3\right)k\left(v_2, v_4\right) + h\left(v_2, v_4\right)k\left(v_1, v_3\right) \\
{}-{} &h\left(v_1, v_4\right)k\left(v_2, v_3\right) - h\left(v_2, v_3\right)k\left(v_1, v_4\right)
\end{align}$$

In tensor component notation, this can be written as

$$\begin{align}
C_{ik\ell m} = R_{ik\ell m}
+{} &\frac{1}{n - 2} \left(R_{im}g_{k\ell} - R_{i\ell}g_{km} + R_{k\ell}g_{im} - R_{km}g_{i\ell} \right) \\
{}+{} &\frac{1}{(n - 1)(n - 2)} R \left(g_{i\ell}g_{km} - g_{im}g_{k\ell} \right).\
\end{align}$$

The ordinary (1,3) valent Weyl tensor is then given by contracting the above with the inverse of the metric.

The decomposition (1) expresses the Riemann tensor as an orthogonal direct sum, in the sense that

$$|R|^2 = |C|^2 + \left|\frac{1}{n - 2}\left(\mathrm{Ric} - \frac{s}{n}g\right) {~\wedge\!\!\!\!\!\!\!\!\;\bigcirc~} g\right|^2 + \left|\frac{s}{2n(n - 1)}g {~\wedge\!\!\!\!\!\!\!\!\;\bigcirc~} g\right|^2.$$

This decomposition, known as the Ricci decomposition, expresses the Riemann curvature tensor into its irreducible components under the action of the orthogonal group. In dimension 4, the Weyl tensor further decomposes into invariant factors for the action of the special orthogonal group, the self-dual and antiself-dual parts C^{+} and C^{−}.

The Weyl tensor can also be expressed using the Schouten tensor, which is a trace-adjusted multiple of the Ricci tensor,

$$P = \frac{1}{n - 2}\left(\mathrm{Ric} - \frac{s}{2(n-1)}g\right).$$

Then

$$C = R - P {~\wedge\!\!\!\!\!\!\!\!\;\bigcirc~} g.$$

In indices,

$$C_{abcd} = R_{abcd} - \frac{2}{n - 2}\left(g_{a[c}R_{d]b} - g_{b[c}R_{d]a}\right) + \frac{2}{(n - 1)(n - 2)}R~g_{a[c}g_{d]b}$$

where $R_{abcd}$ is the Riemann tensor, $R_{ab}$ is the Ricci tensor, $R$ is the Ricci scalar (the scalar curvature) and brackets around indices refers to the antisymmetric part. Equivalently,

$${C_{ab}}^{cd} = {R_{ab}}^{cd} - 4S_{[a}^{[c}\delta_{b]}^{d]}$$

where S denotes the Schouten tensor.

== Properties ==
=== Conformal rescaling ===
The Weyl tensor has the special property that it is invariant under conformal changes to the metric. That is, if $g_{\mu\nu}\mapsto g'_{\mu\nu} = f g_{\mu\nu}$ for some positive scalar function $f$ then the (1,3) valent Weyl tensor satisfies ${C'}^{a}_{\ \ bcd} = C^{a}_{\ \ bcd}$. For this reason the Weyl tensor is also called the conformal tensor. It follows that a necessary condition for a Riemannian manifold to be conformally flat is that the Weyl tensor vanish. In dimensions ≥ 4 this condition is sufficient as well. In dimension 3 the vanishing of the Cotton tensor is a necessary and sufficient condition for the Riemannian manifold being conformally flat. Any 2-dimensional (smooth) Riemannian manifold is conformally flat, a consequence of the existence of isothermal coordinates.

Indeed, the existence of a conformally flat scale amounts to solving the overdetermined partial differential equation

$$Ddf - df\otimes df + \left(|df|^2 + \frac{\Delta f}{n - 2}\right)g = \operatorname{Ric}.$$

In dimension ≥ 4, the vanishing of the Weyl tensor is the only integrability condition for this equation; in dimension 3, it is the Cotton tensor instead.

=== Symmetries ===
The Weyl tensor has the same symmetries as the Riemann tensor. This includes:

$$\begin{align}
C(u, v) &= -C(v, u) \\
\langle C(u, v)w, z \rangle &= -\langle C(u, v)z, w \rangle \\
C(u, v)w + C(v, w)u + C(w, u)v &= 0.
\end{align}$$

In addition, of course, the Weyl tensor is trace free:

$$\operatorname{tr} C(u, \cdot)v = 0$$

for all u, v. In indices these four conditions are

$$\begin{align}
C_{abcd} = -C_{bacd} &= -C_{abdc} \\
C_{abcd} + C_{acdb} + C_{adbc} &= 0 \\
{C^a}_{bac} &= 0.
\end{align}$$

=== Bianchi identity ===
Taking traces of the usual second Bianchi identity of the Riemann tensor eventually shows that

$$\nabla_a {C^a}_{bcd} = 2(n - 3)\nabla_{[c}S_{d]b}$$

where S is the Schouten tensor. The valence (0,3) tensor on the right-hand side is the Cotton tensor, apart from the initial factor.

== See also ==
- Curvature of Riemannian manifolds
- Christoffel symbols provides a coordinate expression for the Weyl tensor.
- Lanczos tensor
- Peeling theorem
- Petrov classification
- Plebanski tensor
- Weyl curvature hypothesis
- Weyl scalar
