= Schouten tensor =

Second-order tensor

In Riemannian geometry the Schouten tensor is a second-order tensor introduced by Jan Arnoldus Schouten defined for n ≥ 3 by:

$$P=\frac{1}{n - 2} \left(\mathrm{Ric} -\frac{ R}{2 (n-1)} g\right)\, \Leftrightarrow \mathrm{Ric}=(n-2) P + J g \, ,$$

where Ric is the Ricci tensor (defined by contracting the first and third indices of the Riemann tensor), R is the scalar curvature, g is the Riemannian metric, $J=\frac{1}{2(n-1)}R$ is the trace of P and n is the dimension of the manifold.

The Weyl tensor equals the Riemann curvature tensor minus the Kulkarni–Nomizu product of the Schouten tensor with the metric. In an index notation

$$R_{ijkl}=W_{ijkl}+g_{ik} P_{jl}-g_{jk} P_{il}-g_{il} P_{jk}+g_{jl} P_{ik}\, .$$

The Schouten tensor often appears in conformal geometry because of its relatively simple conformal transformation law

$$g_{ij}\mapsto \Omega^2 g_{ij} \Rightarrow P_{ij}\mapsto P_{ij}-\nabla_i \Upsilon_j + \Upsilon_i \Upsilon_j -\frac12 \Upsilon_k \Upsilon^k g_{ij}\, ,$$

where $\Upsilon_i := \Omega^{-1} \partial_i \Omega\, .$

Up to normalization, the curl of the Schouten tensor is the Cotton tensor.

== See also ==
- Weyl–Schouten theorem
- Cotton tensor
