= Derivation of the Schwarzschild solution =

Exercise in general relativity

The Schwarzschild solution describes spacetime under the influence of a massive, non-rotating, spherically symmetric object. It is considered by some to be one of the simplest and most useful solutions to the Einstein field equations.

== Assumptions and notation ==
Working in a coordinate chart with coordinates $\left(r, \theta, \phi, t \right)$ labelled 1 to 4 respectively, we begin with the metric in its most general form (10 independent components, each of which is a smooth function of 4 variables). The solution is assumed to be spherically symmetric, static and vacuum. For the purposes of this article, these assumptions may be stated as follows (see the relevant links for precise definitions):

1. A spherically symmetric spacetime is one that is invariant under rotations and taking the mirror image.
2. A static spacetime is one in which all metric components are independent of the time coordinate $t$ (so that $\tfrac\partial{\partial t}g_{\mu \nu}=0$) and the geometry of the spacetime is unchanged under a time-reversal $t \rightarrow -t$.
3. A vacuum solution is one that satisfies the equation $T_{ab}=0$. From the Einstein field equations (with zero cosmological constant), this implies that $R_{ab}=0$ since contracting $R_{ab}-\tfrac{R}{2} g_{ab}=0$ yields $R = 0$.
4. Metric signature used here is (+ + + −).

== Diagonalising the metric ==
The first simplification to be made is to diagonalise the metric. Under the coordinate transformation, $(r, \theta, \phi, t) \rightarrow (r, \theta, \phi, -t)$, all metric components should remain the same. The metric components $g_{\mu 4}$ ($\mu \ne 4$) change under this transformation as:

$g_{\mu 4}'=\frac{\partial x^{\alpha}}{\partial x^{'\mu}} \frac{\partial x^{\beta}}{\partial x^{'4}} g_{\alpha \beta}= -g_{\mu 4}$ ($\mu \ne 4$)

But, as we expect $g'_{\mu 4}= g_{\mu 4}$ (metric components remain the same), this means that:

$g_{\mu 4} = 0$ ($\mu \ne 4$)

Similarly, the coordinate transformations $(r, \theta, \phi, t) \rightarrow (r, \theta, -\phi, t)$ and $(r, \theta, \phi, t) \rightarrow (r, -\theta, \phi, t)$ respectively give:

$g_{\mu 3} = 0$ ($\mu \ne 3$)
$g_{\mu 2} = 0$ ($\mu \ne 2$)

Putting all these together gives:

$g_{\mu \nu} = 0$ ($\mu \ne \nu$)

and hence the metric must be of the form:

$$ds^2=\,  g_{11}\,d r^2 + g_{22} \,d \theta ^2 + g_{33} \,d\phi ^2 + g_{44} \,dt ^2$$

where the four metric components are independent of the time coordinate $t$ (by the static assumption).

== Simplifying the components ==
On each hypersurface of constant $t$, constant $\theta$ and constant $\phi$ (i.e., on each radial line), $g_{11}$ should only depend on $r$ (by spherical symmetry). Hence $g_{11}$ is a function of a single variable:

$$g_{11}=A\left(r\right)$$

A similar argument applied to $g_{44}$ shows that:

$$g_{44}=B\left(r\right)$$

On the hypersurfaces of constant $t$ and constant $r$, it is required that the metric be that of a 2-sphere:

$$dl^2=r_{0}^2 (d \theta^2 + \sin^2 \theta\,d\phi^2)$$

Choosing one of these hypersurfaces (the one with radius $r_{0}$, say), the metric components restricted to this hypersurface (which we denote by $\tilde{g}_{22}$ and $\tilde{g}_{33}$) should be unchanged under rotations through $\theta$ and $\phi$ (again, by spherical symmetry). Comparing the forms of the metric on this hypersurface gives:

$$\tilde{g}_{22}\left(d \theta^2 + \frac{\tilde{g}_{33}}{\tilde{g}_{22}} \,d\phi^2 \right) = r_{0}^2 (d \theta^2 + \sin^2 \theta\,d\phi^2)$$

which immediately yields:

$\tilde{g}_{22}=r_{0}^2$ and $\tilde{g}_{33}=r_{0}^2 \sin ^2 \theta$

But this is required to hold on each hypersurface; hence,

$g_{22}=\, r^2$ and $g_{33}=\, r^2 \sin^2 \theta$

An alternative intuitive way to see that $g_{22}$ and $g_{33}$ must be the same as for a flat spacetime is that stretching or compressing an elastic material in a spherically symmetric manner (radially) will not change the angular distance between two points.

Thus, the metric can be put in the form:

$$ds^2=A\left(r\right)dr^2+r^2\,d \theta^2+r^2 \sin^2 \theta\,d\phi^2 + B\left(r\right) dt^2$$

with $A$ and $B$ as yet undetermined functions of $r$. Note that if $A$ or $B$ is equal to zero at some point, the metric would be singular at that point.

== Calculating the Christoffel symbols ==
Using the metric above, we find the Christoffel symbols, where the indices are $(1,2,3,4)=(r,\theta,\phi,t)$. The sign $'$ denotes a total derivative of a function.

$$\Gamma^1_{ik} = \begin{bmatrix}
A'/\left( 2A \right) & 0 & 0 & 0\\
0 & -r/A & 0 & 0\\
0 & 0 & -r \sin^2 \theta /A & 0\\
0 & 0 & 0 & -B'/\left( 2A \right) \end{bmatrix}$$
$$\Gamma^2_{ik} = \begin{bmatrix}
0 & 1/r & 0 & 0\\
1/r & 0 & 0 & 0\\
0 & 0 & -\sin\theta\cos\theta & 0\\
0 & 0 & 0 & 0 \end{bmatrix}$$
$$\Gamma^3_{ik} = \begin{bmatrix}
0 & 0 & 1/r & 0\\
0 & 0 & \cot\theta & 0\\
1/r & \cot\theta & 0 &  0 \\
0 & 0 & 0 & 0 \end{bmatrix}$$
$$\Gamma^4_{ik} = \begin{bmatrix}
0 & 0 & 0 & B'/\left( 2B \right)\\
0 & 0 & 0 & 0\\
0 & 0 & 0 & 0 \\
B'/\left( 2B \right) & 0 & 0 & 0\end{bmatrix}$$

== Using the field equations to find A(r) and B(r) ==
To determine $A$ and $B$, the vacuum field equations are employed:

$$R_{\alpha\beta}=\, 0$$

Hence:

$${\Gamma^\rho_{\beta\alpha,\rho}} - \Gamma^\rho_{\rho\alpha,\beta}
+ \Gamma^\rho_{\rho\lambda} \Gamma^\lambda_{\beta\alpha}
- \Gamma^\rho_{\beta\lambda}\Gamma^\lambda_{\rho\alpha\vphantom{\beta}}=0\,,$$

where a comma is used to set off the index that is being used for the derivative. The Ricci curvature is diagonal in the given coordinates:

$$R_{tt} = -\frac{1}{4}\frac{B'}{A}\left(\frac{A'}{A}-\frac{B'}{B}+\frac{4}{r}\right) -\frac{1}{2}\left(\frac{B'}{A}\right)' ,$$
$$R_{rr} = -\frac{1}{2}\left(\frac{B'}{B}\right)^{'} -\frac{1}{4}\left(\frac{B'}{B}\right)^{2} + \frac{1}{4}\frac{A'}{A}\left(\frac{B'}{B}+\frac{4}{r}\right) ,$$
$$R_{\theta\theta} = 1-\left(\frac{r}{A}\right)^{'} -\frac{r}{2A}\left(\frac{A'}{A}+\frac{B'}{B}\right) ,$$
$$R_{\phi\phi} = \sin^2(\theta)R_{\theta\theta},$$

where the prime means the r derivative of the functions.

Only three of the field equations are nontrivial (the fourth equation is just $\sin^2 \theta$ times the third equation) and upon simplification become, respectively:

$$4 A' B^2 - 2 r B'' AB + r A' B'B + r B' ^2 A=0 ,$$
$$- 2 r B'' AB + r A' B'B + r B' ^2 A - 4B' AB=0 ,$$
$$r A'B + 2 A^2 B - 2AB - r B' A=0$$

Subtracting the first and second equations produces:

$$A'B +A B'=0 \Rightarrow A(r)B(r) =K$$

where $K$ is a non-zero real constant. Substituting $A(r)B(r) = K$ into the third equation and tidying up gives:

$$r A' =A(1-A)$$

which has general solution:

$$A(r)=\left(1+\frac{1}{Sr}\right)^{-1}$$

for some non-zero real constant $S$. Hence, the metric for a static, spherically symmetric vacuum solution is now of the form:

$$ds^2=\left(1+\frac{1}{S r}\right)^{-1}dr^2+r^2(d \theta^2 + \sin^2 \theta\,d\phi^2)+K \left(1+\frac{1}{S r}\right)dt^2$$

Note that the spacetime represented by the above metric is asymptotically flat, i.e. as $r \rightarrow \infty$, the metric approaches that of the Minkowski metric and the spacetime manifold resembles that of Minkowski space.

== Using the weak-field approximation to find K and S ==
This diagram gives the route to find the Schwarzschild solution by using the weak field approximation. The equality on the second row gives g_{44} = −c^{2} + 2GM/r, assuming the desired solution degenerates to Minkowski metric when the motion happens far away from the black hole (r approaches to positive infinity).

The geodesics of the metric (obtained where $ds$ is extremised) must, in some limit (e.g., toward infinite speed of light), agree with the solutions of Newtonian motion (e.g., obtained by Lagrange equations). (The metric must also limit to Minkowski space when the mass it represents vanishes.)

$$0=\delta\int\frac{ds}{dt}dt=\delta\int(KE+PE_g)dt$$

(where $KE$ is the kinetic energy and $PE_g$ is the Potential Energy due to gravity) The constants $K$ and $S$ are fully determined by some variant of this approach; from the weak-field approximation one arrives at the result:

$$g_{44}=K\left(1 +\frac{1}{Sr}\right) \approx -c^2+\frac{2Gm}{r} = -c^2 \left(1-\frac{2Gm}{c^2 r} \right)$$

where $G$ is the gravitational constant, $m$ is the mass of the gravitational source and $c$ is the speed of light. It is found that:

$K=\, -c^2$ and $\frac{1}{S}=-\frac{2Gm}{c^2}$

Hence:

$A(r)=\left(1-\frac{2Gm}{c^2 r}\right)^{-1}$ and $B(r)=-c^2 \left(1-\frac{2Gm}{c^2 r}\right)$

So, the Schwarzschild metric may finally be written in the form:

$$ds^2=\left(1-\frac{2Gm}{c^2 r}\right)^{-1}dr^2+r^2(d \theta^2 +\sin^2 \theta\,d\phi^2)-c^2 \left(1-\frac{2Gm}{c^2 r}\right)dt^2$$

Note that:

$$\frac{2Gm}{c^2}=r_\text{s}$$

is the definition of the Schwarzschild radius for an object of mass $m$, so the Schwarzschild metric may be rewritten in the alternative form:

$$ds^2=\left(1-\frac{r_\text{s}}{r}\right)^{-1}dr^2+r^2(d\theta^2 +\sin^2\theta\,d\phi^2)-c^2\left(1-\frac{r_\text{s}}{r}\right)dt^2$$

which shows that the metric becomes singular approaching the event horizon (that is, $r \rightarrow r_\text{s}$). The metric singularity is not a physical one (although there is a real physical singularity at $r=0$), as can be shown by using a suitable coordinate transformation (e.g. the Kruskal–Szekeres coordinate system).

== Alternate derivation using known physics in special cases ==
[This derivation is flawed because it assumes Kepler's 3rd law. This is unfounded because that law has relativistic corrections. For example, the meaning of "r" is physical distance in that classical law, and merely a coordinate in General Relativity.] The Schwarzschild metric can also be derived using the known physics for a circular orbit and a temporarily stationary point mass. Start with the metric with coefficients that are unknown coefficients of $r$:

$$-c^2 = \left ( {ds \over d\tau} \right )^2 = A(r)\left ( {dr \over d\tau} \right )^2 + r^2\left ( {d\phi \over d\tau} \right )^2 + B(r)\left( {dt \over d\tau} \right)^2.$$

Now apply the Euler–Lagrange equation to the arc length integral $\textstyle { J=\int_{\tau_1}^{\tau_2} \sqrt{-\left(ds/d\tau\right)^2 }\,d\tau }$. Since $ds/d\tau$ is constant, the integrand can be replaced with $(ds/d\tau)^2,$ because the E–L equation is exactly the same if the integrand is multiplied by any constant. Applying the E–L equation to $J$ with the modified integrand yields:

$$\begin{array}{lcl} A'(r)\dot{r}^2 + 2r\dot{\phi}^2 + B'(r)\dot{t}^2 & = & 2A'(r)\dot{r}^2 + 2A(r)\ddot{r} \\ 0 & = & 2r\dot{r}\dot{\phi} + r^2\ddot{\phi} \\ 0 & = & B'(r)\dot{r}\dot{t} + B(r)\ddot{t} \end{array}$$

where dot denotes differentiation with respect to $\tau$.

In a circular orbit $\dot{r}=\ddot{r}=0$, so the first E–L equation above is equivalent to

$$2r\dot{\phi}^2 + B'(r)\dot{t}^2 = 0 \Leftrightarrow B'(r) = -2r\dot{\phi}^2/\dot{t}^2 = -2r(d\phi/dt)^2.$$

Kepler's third law of motion is

$$\frac{T^2}{r^3} = \frac{4\pi^2}{G(M+m)}.$$

In a circular orbit, the period $T$ equals $2\pi / (d\phi/dt)$, implying

$$\left( {d\phi \over dt} \right)^2 = GM/r^3$$

since the point mass $m$ is negligible compared to the mass of the central body $M$. So $B'(r) = -2GM/r^2$ and integrating this yields $B(r) = 2GM/r + C$, where $C$ is an unknown constant of integration. $C$ can be determined by setting $M=0$, in which case the spacetime is flat and $B(r)=-c^2$. So $C = -c^2$ and

$$B(r) = 2GM/r - c^2 = c^2(2GM/c^2r - 1) = c^2(r_\text{s}/r - 1).$$

When the point mass is temporarily stationary, $\dot{r}=0$ and $\dot{\phi}=0$. The original metric equation becomes $\dot{t}^2 = -c^2/B(r)$ and the first E–L equation above becomes $A(r) = B'(r)\dot{t}^2 / (2\ddot{r})$. When the point mass is temporarily stationary, $\ddot{r}$ is the acceleration of gravity, $-MG/r^2$. So

$$A(r) = \left(\frac{-2MG}{r^2}\right) \left(\frac{-c^2}{2MG/r - c^2}\right) \left(-\frac{r^2}{2MG}\right) = \frac{1}{1 - 2MG/(rc^2)} = \frac{1}{1 - r_\text{s}/r}.$$

== Alternative form in isotropic coordinates ==
The original formulation of the metric uses anisotropic coordinates in which the velocity of light is not the same in the radial and transverse directions. Arthur Eddington gave alternative forms in isotropic coordinates. For isotropic spherical coordinates $r_1$, $\theta$, $\phi$, coordinates $\theta$ and $\phi$ are unchanged, and then (provided that $r \geq {2 Gm}/{c^2}$)

$r = r_1 \left(1+\frac{Gm}{2c^2 r_1}\right)^{2}$ , $dr = dr_1 \left(1-\frac{(Gm)^2}{4c^4 r_1^2}\right)$

and

$$\left(1-\frac{2Gm}{c^2 r}\right) = \left(1-\frac{Gm}{2c^2 r_1}\right)^{2} \Bigg/ \left(1+\frac{Gm}{2c^2 r_1}\right)^{2}$$

Then for isotropic rectangular coordinates $x$, $y$, $z$,

$x = r_1\, \sin(\theta)\, \cos(\phi) ,$ $y = r_1\, \sin(\theta)\, \sin(\phi) ,$ $z = r_1\, \cos(\theta)$

The metric then becomes, in isotropic rectangular coordinates:

$$ds^2= \left(1+\frac{Gm}{2c^2 r_1}\right)^{4}(dx^2+dy^2+dz^2) -c^2 dt^2 \left(1-\frac{Gm}{2c^2 r_1}\right)^{2} \Bigg/ \left(1+\frac{Gm}{2c^2 r_1}\right)^{2}$$

== Dispensing with the static assumption – Birkhoff's theorem ==
In deriving the Schwarzschild metric, it was assumed that the metric was vacuum, spherically symmetric and static. The static assumption is unneeded, as Birkhoff's theorem states that any spherically symmetric vacuum solution of Einstein's field equations is stationary; the Schwarzschild solution thus follows. Birkhoff's theorem has the consequence that any pulsating star that remains spherically symmetric does not generate gravitational waves, as the region exterior to the star remains static.

== See also ==
- Karl Schwarzschild
- Kerr metric
- Reissner–Nordström metric
