= McVittie metric =

Solution of Einstein field equations

In the general theory of relativity, the McVittie metric is the exact solution of Einstein's field equations that describes a black hole or massive object immersed in an expanding cosmological spacetime. The solution was first fully obtained by George McVittie in the 1930s, while investigating the effect of the, then recently discovered, expansion of the Universe on a mass particle.

The simplest case of a spherically symmetric solution to the field equations of General Relativity with a cosmological constant term, the de Sitter–Schwarzschild spacetime, arises as a specific case of the McVittie metric, with positive 3-space scalar curvature $\kappa = +1$ and constant Hubble parameter $H(t) = H_0$.

== Metric ==
In isotropic coordinates, the McVittie metric is given by

$$ds^2 =-\left(\frac{1-\frac{GM}{2c^2a(t)r}K^{1/2}(r)}{1+\frac{GM}{2c^2a(t)r}K^{1/2}(r)} \right)^2 c^2dt^2 + \frac{\left(1 + \frac{GM}{2c^2a(t)r}K^{1/2}(r) \right)^4}{K^2(r)} a^2(t)(dr^2 + r^2d\Omega^2),$$

where $d\Omega^2$ is the usual line element for the euclidean sphere, $M$ is identified as the mass of the massive object, $a(t)$ is the usual scale factor found in the FLRW metric, which accounts for the expansion of the space-time; and $K(r)$ is a curvature parameter related to the scalar curvature $\kappa$ of the 3-space as

$$K(r) = 1 + \kappa r^2 = 1 + \frac{r^2}{4R^2}, \qquad \kappa \in \{+1, 0, -1\},$$

which is related to the curvature of the 3-space exactly as in the FLRW spacetime. It is generally assumed that $\dot{a}(t)> 0$, otherwise the Universe is undergoing a contraction.

One can define the time-dependent mass parameter $\mu(t) \equiv GM/2c^2a(t)r$, which accounts for the mass density inside the expanding, comoving radius $a(t)r$ at time $t$, to write the metric in a more succinct way

$$ds^2 = -\left(\frac{1-\mu(t)K^{1/2}(r)}{1+\mu(t)K^{1/2}(r)} \right)^2 c^2dt^2 + \frac{\left(1 +\mu(t)K^{1/2}(r) \right)^4}{K^2(r)} a^2(t)(dr^2 + r^2d\Omega^2),$$

== Causal structure and singularities ==
From here on, it is useful to define $m = GM/c^2$. For McVittie metrics with the general expanding FLRW solutions properties $H(t) = \dot{a}(t)/a(t) > 0$ and $\lim_{t\rightarrow \infty} H(t) = H_0 = 0$, the spacetime has the property of containing at least two singularities. One is a cosmological, null-like naked singularity at the smallest positive root $r_-$ of the equation $1-2m/r - H_0^2r^2 = 0$. This is interpreted as the black hole event-horizon in the case where $H_0 > 0$. For the $H_0 > 0$ case, there is an event horizon at $r = r_-$, but no singularity, which is extinguished by the existence of an asymptotic de Sitter–Schwarzschild phase of the spacetime.

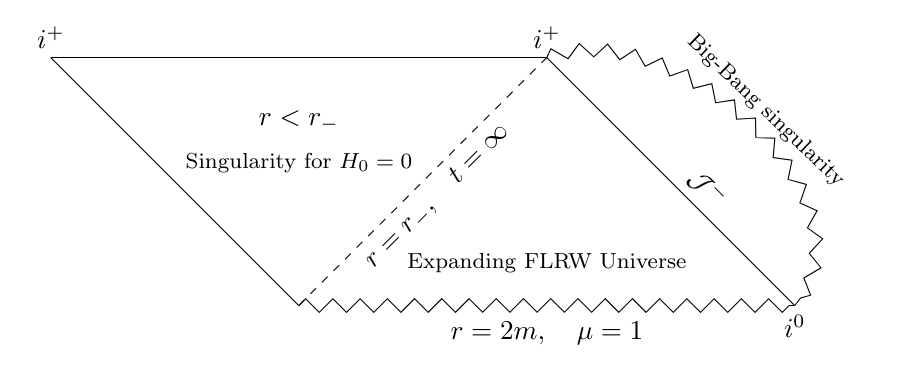
Penrose-Carter diagram for the McVittie metric. The past and future infinite of time-like geodesics are the conformal points at infinity $i^0$ and $i^+$ respectively. There are event horizons at the solutions of $1-2m/r - H_0^2r^2 = 0$, which are indicated by the slashed and solid lines. $\cal{J}^-$ indicates the causal past of particle worldlines.

The second singularity lies at the causal past of all events in the space-time, and is a space-time singularity at $r = 2m, \mu(t) = 1$, which, due to its causal past nature, is interpreted as the usual Big-Bang like singularity.

There are also at least two event horizons: one at the largest solution of $1-2m/r - H_0^2r^2 = 0$, and space-like, protecting the Big-Bang singularity at finite past time; and one at the $r = r_-$ smallest root of the equation, also at finite time. The second event horizon becomes a black hole horizon for the $H_0 > 0$ case.

== Schwarzschild and FLRW limits ==
One can obtain the Schwarzschild and Robertson-Walker metrics from the McVittie metric in the exact limits of $k = 0, \dot{a}(t) = 0$ and $\mu(t) = 0$, respectively. In trying to describe the behavior of a mass particle in an expanding Universe, the original paper of McVittie a black hole spacetime with decreasing Schwarschild radius $r_\text{S}$ for an expanding surrounding cosmological spacetime. However, one can also interpret, in the limit of a small mass parameter $\mu(t)$, a perturbed FLRW spacetime, with $\mu$ the Newtonian perturbation. Below we describe how to derive these analogies between the Schwarzschild and FLRW spacetimes from the McVittie metric.

=== Schwarzschild ===
In the case of a flat 3-space, with scalar curvature constant $k=0$, the metric (1) becomes

$$ds^2 = -\left(\frac{1-\frac{M}{2a(t)r}}{1+\frac{M}{2a(t)r}} \right)^2 c^2dt^2 + \left(1 + \frac{M}{2a(t)r}\right)^4 a^2(t)(dr^2 + r^2d\Omega^2),$$

which, for each instant of cosmic time $t_0$, is the metric of the region outside of a Schwarzschild black hole in isotropic coordinates, with Schwarzschild radius $r_\text{S} = \dfrac{2GM}{a(t_0)c^2}$.

To make this equivalence more explicit, one can make the change of radial variables

$$r' = r\left(1+ \frac{M}{2a(t)r}\right)^2,$$

to obtain the metric in Schwarzschild coordinates:

$$ds^2 = -\left(1-\frac{2M}{a(t)r'}\right)c^2dt^2 + \left(1-\frac{2M}{a(t)r'}\right)dr'^2 + r'^2d\Omega^2.$$

The interesting feature of this form of the metric is that one can clearly see that the Schwarzschild radius, which dictates at which distance from the center of the massive body the event horizon is formed, shrinks as the Universe expands. For a comoving observer, which accompanies the Hubble flow this effect is not perceptible, as its radial coordinate is given by $r'_{(\text{comov})} = a(t)r'$, such that, for the comoving observer, $r_\text{S} = 2M/r'_{(\text{comov})}$ is constant, and the Event Horizon will remain static.

=== FLRW ===
In the case of a vanishing mass parameter $\mu(t) = 0$, the McVittie metric becomes exactly the FLRW metric in spherical coordinates

$$ds^2 = -c^2dt^2 + \frac{a^2(t)}{\left( 1 - \frac{r^2}{4R^2} \right)^2}(dr^2 + r^2d\Omega^2),$$

which leads to the exact Friedmann equations for the evolution of the scale factor $a(t)$.

If one takes the limit of the mass parameter $\mu(t) = M/2a(t)r \ll 1$, the metric (1) becomes

$$ds^2 = -\left(1-4\mu(t)K(r)\right)^2 c^2dt^2 + \frac{\left(1+4\mu(t)K(r)\right)}{K^2(r)} a^2(t)(dr^2 + r^2d\Omega^2),$$

which can be mapped to a perturberd FLRW spacetime in Newtonian gauge, with perturbation potential $\Phi = 2\mu(t)$; that is, one can understand the small mass of the central object as the perturbation in the FLRW metric.

== See also ==
- Cosmology
- Singularity theorems
