= Gaussian polar coordinates =

Coordinate system

In the theory of Lorentzian manifolds, spherically symmetric spacetimes admit a family of nested round spheres. In each of these spheres, every point can be carried to any other by an appropriate rotation about the centre of symmetry.

There are several different types of coordinate chart that are adapted to this family of nested spheres, each introducing a different kind of distortion. The best known alternative is the Schwarzschild chart, which correctly represents distances within each sphere, but (in general) distorts radial distances and angles. Another popular choice is the isotropic chart, which correctly represents angles (but in general distorts both radial and transverse distances). A third choice is the Gaussian polar chart, which correctly represents radial distances, but distorts transverse distances and angles. There are other possible charts; the article on spherically symmetric spacetime describes a coordinate system with intuitively appealing features for studying infalling matter. In all cases, the nested geometric spheres are represented by coordinate spheres, so we can say that their roundness is correctly represented.

== Definition ==
In a Gaussian polar chart (on a static spherically symmetric spacetime), the metric (a.k.a. line element) takes the form

$$g = -a(r)^2 \, dt^2 + dr^2 + b(r)^2 \, \left( d\theta^2 + \sin(\theta)^2 \, d\phi^2 \right),$$
$$-\infty < t < \infty, \, r_0 < r < r_1, \, 0 < \theta < \pi, \, -\pi < \phi < \pi.$$

Depending on context, it may be appropriate to regard $a$ and $b$ as undetermined functions of the radial coordinate $r$. Alternatively, we can plug in specific functions (possibly depending on some parameters) to obtain an isotropic coordinate chart on a specific Lorentzian spacetime.

== Applications ==
Gaussian charts are often less convenient than Schwarzschild or isotropic charts. However, they have found occasional application in the theory of static spherically symmetric perfect fluids.

== See also ==
- Static spacetime
- Static spherically symmetric perfect fluids
- Schwarzschild coordinates
- Isotropic coordinates
- Frame fields in general relativity for more about frame fields and coframe fields.
