= Penrose diagram =

Diagram of different points in spacetime

Penrose diagram of an infinite Minkowski universe, horizontal axis u, vertical axis v

In theoretical physics, a Penrose diagram (named after mathematical physicist Roger Penrose) is a two-dimensional diagram capturing the causal relations between different points in spacetime through a conformal treatment of infinity. It is an extension (suitable for the curved spacetimes of e.g. general relativity) of the Minkowski diagram of special relativity where the vertical dimension represents time, and the horizontal dimension represents a space dimension. Using this design, all light rays take a 45° path $(c = 1)$. Locally, the metric on a Penrose diagram is conformally equivalent to the metric of the spacetime depicted. The conformal factor is chosen such that the entire infinite spacetime is transformed into a Penrose diagram of finite size, with infinity on the boundary of the diagram. For spherically symmetric spacetimes, every point in the Penrose diagram corresponds to a 2-dimensional sphere $(\theta,\phi)$.

== Basic properties ==
While Penrose diagrams share the same basic coordinate vector system of other spacetime diagrams for local asymptotically flat spacetime, it introduces a system by which spacetime distances that are considered infinitely far away are compactified into finite locations in the diagram. Straight lines of constant time and straight lines of constant space coordinates therefore become curves that appear to converge at points in the corners of the diagram. These points and boundaries represent conformal infinity for spacetime, which was first introduced by Penrose in 1963.

Penrose diagrams are more properly (but less frequently) called Penrose–Carter diagrams (or Carter–Penrose diagrams), acknowledging both Brandon Carter and Roger Penrose, who were the first researchers to employ them. They are also called conformal diagrams, or simply spacetime diagrams (although the latter may refer to Minkowski diagrams).

Two lines drawn at 45° angles should intersect in the diagram only if the corresponding two light rays intersect in the actual spacetime. So, a Penrose diagram can be used as a concise illustration of spacetime regions that are accessible to observation. The diagonal boundary lines of a Penrose diagram correspond to the region called "null infinity", or to singularities where light rays must end. Thus, Penrose diagrams are also useful in the study of asymptotic properties of spacetimes and singularities. An infinite static Minkowski universe, coordinates $(x, t)$ is related to Penrose coordinates $(u, v)$ by:

$$\tan(u \pm v) = x \pm t$$

The corners of the Penrose diagram, which represent the spacelike and timelike conformal infinities, are $\pi /2$ from the origin.

== Black holes ==
Penrose diagrams are frequently used to illustrate the causal structure of spacetimes containing black holes. Singularities in the Schwarzschild solution are denoted by a spacelike boundary, unlike the timelike boundary found on conventional spacetime diagrams. This is due to the interchanging of timelike and spacelike coordinates within the horizon of a black hole (since space is uni-directional within the horizon, just as time is uni-directional outside the horizon). The singularity is represented by a spacelike boundary to make it clear that once an object has passed the horizon it will inevitably hit the singularity even if it attempts to take evasive action.

Penrose diagrams are often used to illustrate the hypothetical Einstein–Rosen bridge connecting two separate universes in the maximally extended Schwarzschild black hole solution. The precursors to the Penrose diagrams were Kruskal–Szekeres diagrams. (The Penrose diagram adds to Kruskal and Szekeres' diagram the conformal crunching of the regions of flat spacetime far from the hole.) These introduced the method of aligning the event horizon into past and future horizons oriented at 45° angles (since one would need to travel faster than light to cross from the Schwarzschild radius back into flat spacetime); and splitting the singularity into past and future horizontally-oriented lines (since the singularity "cuts off" all paths into the future once one enters the hole).

The Einstein–Rosen bridge closes off (forming "future" singularities) so rapidly that passage between the two asymptotically flat exterior regions would require faster-than-light velocity, and is therefore impossible. In addition, highly blue-shifted light rays (called a blue sheet) would make it impossible for anyone to pass through.

Penrose diagrams of various black hole solutions

The maximally extended solution does not describe a typical black hole created from the collapse of a star, as the surface of the collapsed star replaces the sector of the solution containing the past-oriented white hole geometry and other universe.

While the basic space-like passage of a static black hole cannot be traversed, the Penrose diagrams for solutions representing rotating and/or electrically charged black holes illustrate these solutions' inner event horizons (lying in the future) and vertically oriented singularities, which open up what is known as a time-like "wormhole" allowing passage into future universes. In the case of the rotating hole, by entering the hole close to its axis of rotation, a "negative" universe can be entered through a ring singularity (that is still portrayed as a line in the diagram). These features of the solutions are, however, not stable under perturbations, and not believed to be a realistic description of the interior regions of such black holes; the true character of their interiors is still an open question.

== See also ==
- Causality
- Causal structure
- Conformal cyclic cosmology
- Weyl transformation
