= Charged black hole =

Black hole with electric charge

Animated illustration of a black hole.

A charged black hole is a black hole that possesses electric charge. Since the electromagnetic repulsion in compressing an electrically charged mass is dramatically greater than the gravitational attraction (by about 40 orders of magnitude), it is not expected that black holes with a significant electric charge will be formed in nature.

== Categories ==
The two types of charged black holes are Reissner–Nordström black holes (without spin), and Kerr–Newman black holes (with spin).

A black hole can be completely characterized by three (and only three) quantities:

- M – mass
- J – angular momentum
- Q – electric charge

Charged black holes are two of four possible types of black holes that have been found by solving Einstein's theory of gravitation, general relativity. The mathematical solutions for the shape of space and the electric and magnetic fields near a black hole are named after the persons who first derived them. The solutions increase in complexity depending on which of the two parameters, J and Q, are zero (or not) (the mass M of a black hole could conceivably be tiny, but not zero). The four categories of solutions are given in the table below:

Black hole type	Description	Constraints
Schwarzschild	has no angular momentum and no electric charge	J = 0	Q = 0
Kerr	does have angular momentum but no electric charge		Q = 0
Reissner–Nordström	has no angular momentum but does have an electric charge	J = 0
Kerr–Newman	has both angular momentum and an electric charge

The solutions of Einstein's field equation for the gravitational field of an electrically charged point mass (with zero angular momentum), in empty space was obtained in 1918 by Hans Reissner and Gunnar Nordström, not long after Karl Schwarzschild found the Schwarzschild metric as a solution for a point mass without electric charge and angular momentum.

A mathematically oriented article describes that the Reissner–Nordström metric for a charged, non-rotating black hole. A similarly technical article on the Kerr–Newman black hole gives an overview of the most general known solution for a black hole, which has both angular momentum and charge (all the other solutions are simplified special cases of the Kerr–Newman black hole).

== See also ==
- Reissner–Nordström metric
