= Schwarzschild coordinates =

Coordinate system in black hole physics

In the theory of Lorentzian manifolds, spherically symmetric spacetimes admit a family of nested round spheres. In such a spacetime, a particularly important kind of coordinate chart is the Schwarzschild chart, a kind of polar spherical coordinate chart on a static and spherically symmetric spacetime, which is adapted to these nested round spheres. The defining characteristic of Schwarzschild chart is that the radial coordinate possesses a natural geometric interpretation in terms of the surface area and Gaussian curvature of each sphere. However, radial distances and angles are not accurately represented.

These charts have many applications in metric theories of gravitation such as general relativity. They are most often used in static spherically symmetric spacetimes. In the case of general relativity, Birkhoff's theorem states that every isolated spherically symmetric vacuum or electrovacuum solution of the Einstein field equation is static, but this is certainly not true for perfect fluids. The extension of the exterior region of the Schwarzschild vacuum solution inside the event horizon of a spherically symmetric black hole is not static inside the horizon, and the family of (spacelike) nested spheres cannot be extended inside the horizon, so the Schwarzschild chart for this solution necessarily breaks down at the horizon.

== Definition ==
Specifying a metric tensor $g$ is part of the definition of any Lorentzian manifold. The simplest way to define this tensor is to define it in compatible local coordinate charts and verify that the same tensor is defined on the overlaps of the domains of the charts. In this article, we will only attempt to define the metric tensor in the domain of a single chart.

In a Schwarzschild chart (on a static spherically symmetric spacetime), the line element takes the form
$$\begin{align}
g &= -a(r)^2 \, dt^2 + b(r)^2 \, dr^2 + r^2 \left( d\theta^2 + \sin^2\theta \, d\phi^2 \right) \\
&= -a(r)^2 \, dt^2 + b(r)^2 \, dr^2 + r^2 g_\Omega
\end{align}$$
$$\begin{align} -\infty &< t < \infty, \, & r_0 &< r < r_1, \,\\ 0 &< \theta < \pi,\, & -\pi &< \phi < \pi \end{align}$$
Where $\Omega = (\theta, \phi)$ is the standard spherical coordinate and $g_\Omega$ is the standard metric on the unit 2-sphere. See Deriving the Schwarzschild solution for a more detailed derivation of this expression.

Depending on context, it may be appropriate to regard a and b as undetermined functions of the radial coordinate (for example, in deriving an exact static spherically symmetric solution of the Einstein field equation). Alternatively, we can plug in specific functions (possibly depending on some parameters) to obtain a Schwarzschild coordinate chart on a specific Lorentzian spacetime.

If this turns out to admit a stress–energy tensor such that the resulting model satisfies the Einstein field equation (say, for a static spherically symmetric perfect fluid obeying suitable energy conditions and other properties expected of reasonable perfect fluid), then, with appropriate tensor fields representing physical quantities such as matter and momentum densities, we have a piece of a possibly larger spacetime; a piece which can be considered a local solution of the Einstein field equation.

== Killing vector fields ==
With respect to the Schwarzschild chart, the Lie algebra of Killing vector fields is generated by the timelike irrotational Killing vector field
$$\partial_t$$
(Note: $\partial_t$ is notation for a vector field pointing in the timelike direction. It is written so as to resemble the differential operator with respect to t, because derivatives can be taken along this direction. The notation $\partial_x$ = $\partial /\partial x$ is frequently and generically used to denote a vector field in the tangent bundle.) and three spacelike Killing vector fields
$$\partial_\phi$$
$$\sin\phi \, \partial_\theta + \cot\theta \, \cos\phi\, \partial_\phi$$
$$\cos\phi \, \partial_\theta - \cot\theta \, \sin\phi\, \partial_\phi$$
Here, saying that $\vec{X} = \partial_t$ is irrotational means that the vorticity tensor of the corresponding timelike congruence vanishes; thus, this Killing vector field is hypersurface orthogonal. The fact that our spacetime admits an irrotational timelike Killing vector field is in fact the defining characteristic of a static spacetime. One immediate consequence is that the constant time coordinate surfaces $t=t_0$ form a family of (isometric) spatial hyperslices. (This is not true for example in the Boyer–Lindquist chart for the exterior region of the Kerr vacuum, where the timelike coordinate vector is not hypersurface orthogonal.)

Note the last two fields are rotations of one-another, under the coordinate transformation $\phi\mapsto\phi+\pi/2$. The article on Killing vector fields provides a detailed derivation and discussion of the three space-like fields.

== A family of static nested spheres ==
In the Schwarzschild chart, the surfaces $t=t_0, \, r=r_0$ appear as round spheres (when we plot loci in polar spherical fashion), and from its form, we see that the Schwarzschild metric restricted to any of these surfaces is positive definite and given by
$$g|_{t = t_0, r = r_0} = r_0^2 g_{\Omega} = r_0^2 \left( d\theta^2 + \sin^2\theta \, d\phi^2 \right), \; 0 < \theta < \pi,\; -\pi < \phi < \pi$$
Where $g_\Omega$ is the standard Riemannian metric on the unit radius 2-sphere. That is, these nested coordinate spheres do in fact represent geometric spheres with

1. surface area $A = 4 \pi r_0^2$
2. Gaussian curvature $K = 1/r_0^2$

In particular, they are geometric round spheres. Moreover, the angular coordinates $\Omega = (\theta,\phi)$ are exactly the usual polar spherical angular coordinates: $\theta$ is sometimes called the colatitude and $\phi$ is usually called the longitude. This is essentially the defining geometric feature of the Schwarzschild chart.

It may help to add that the four Killing fields given above, considered as abstract vector fields on our Lorentzian manifold, give the truest expression of both the symmetries of a static spherically symmetric spacetime, while the particular trigonometric form which they take in our chart is the truest expression of the meaning of the term Schwarzschild chart. In particular, the three spatial Killing vector fields have exactly the same form as the three nontranslational Killing vector fields in a spherically symmetric chart on E^{3}; that is, they exhibit the notion of arbitrary Euclidean rotation about the origin or spherical symmetry.

However, note well: in general, the Schwarzschild radial coordinate does not accurately represent radial distances, i.e. distances taken along the spacelike geodesic congruence which arise as the integral curves of $\partial_r$. Rather, to find a suitable notion of 'spatial distance' between two of our nested spheres, we should integrate $b(r) \, dr$ along some coordinate ray from the origin:
$$\Delta \rho = \int_{r_1}^{r_2} b(r) \, dr$$

Similarly, we can regard each sphere as the locus of a spherical cloud of idealized observers, who must (in general) use rocket engines to accelerate radially outward in order to maintain their position. These are static observers, and they have world lines of form $r=r_0, \theta=\theta_0, \phi=\phi_0$, which of course have the form of vertical coordinate lines in the Schwarzschild chart.

In order to compute the proper time interval between two events on the world line of one of these observers, we must integrate $a(r) \, dt$ along the appropriate coordinate line:
$$\Delta \tau =  \int_{t_1}^{t_2} a(r) \, dt$$

== Coordinate singularities ==
Looking back at the coordinate ranges above, note that the coordinate singularity at $t=t_0, \, r=r_0, \, \theta = 0$ marks the location of the North pole of one of our static nested spheres, while $t=t_0, \, r=r_0, \, \theta = \pi$ marks the location of the South pole. Just as for an ordinary polar spherical chart on E^{3}, for topological reasons we cannot obtain continuous coordinates on the entire sphere; we must choose some longitude (a great circle) to act as the prime meridian $\phi=0$ and cut this out of the chart. The result is that we cut out a closed half plane from each spatial hyperslice $t=t_0$ including the axis $r=0$ and a half plane extending from that axis.

When we said above that $\partial_\phi$ is a Killing vector field, we omitted the pedantic but important qualifier that we are thinking of $\phi$ as a cyclic coordinate, and indeed thinking of our three spacelike Killing vectors as acting on round spheres.

Possibly, of course, $r_1 > 0$ or $r_2 < \infty$, in which case we must also excise the region outside some ball, or inside some ball, from the domain of our chart. This happens whenever f or g blow up at some value of the Schwarzschild radial coordinate r.

== Visualizing the static hyperslices ==
To better understand the significance of the Schwarzschild radial coordinate, it may help to embed one of the spatial hyperslices $t=t_0$ (they are of course all isometric to one another) in a flat Euclidean space. People who find it difficult to visualize four-dimensional Euclidean space will be glad to observe that we can take advantage of the spherical symmetry to suppress one coordinate. This may be conveniently achieved by setting $t=0, \theta=\pi/2$. Now we have a two-dimensional Riemannian manifold with a local radial coordinate chart,
$$g|_{t = 0, \theta = \pi/2} = b(r)^2 dr^2 + r^2 d\phi^2, \;\; r_1 < r < r_2, \, -\pi < \phi < \pi$$
To embed this surface (or at an annular ring) in E^{3}, we adopt a frame field in E^{3} which

1. is defined on a parameterized surface, which will inherit the desired metric from the embedding space,
2. is adapted to our radial chart,
3. features an undetermined function $f(r)$.

To wit, consider the parameterized surface
$$(z,r,\phi) \rightarrow (f(r), \, r \cos \phi, \, r \sin \phi )$$
The coordinate vector fields on this surface are
$$\partial_r = (f^\prime(r), \, \cos \phi, \, \sin \phi), \; \; \partial_\phi = (0, -r \sin \phi, r \cos \phi)$$
The induced metric inherited when we restrict the Euclidean metric on E^{3} to our parameterized surface is
$$d\rho^2 = \left( 1 + f^\prime(r)^2 \right) \, dr^2 + r^2 \, d\phi^2, \; r_1 < r < r_2, \, -\pi < \phi < \pi$$
To identify this with the metric of our hyperslice, we should evidently choose $f(r)$ such that
$$f^\prime(r) = \sqrt{1-b(r)^2}$$
To take a somewhat silly example, we might have $b(r) = f(r) = \sin(r)$.

This works for surfaces in which true distances between two radially separated points are larger than the difference between their radial coordinates. If the true distances are smaller, we should embed our Riemannian manifold as a spacelike surface in E^{1,2} instead. For example, we might have $b(r) = f(r) = \sinh(r)$. Sometimes we might need two or more local embeddings of annular rings (for regions of positive or negative Gaussian curvature). In general, we should not expect to obtain a global embedding in any one flat space (with vanishing Riemann tensor).

The point is that the defining characteristic of a Schwarzschild chart in terms of the geometric interpretation of the radial coordinate is just what we need to carry out (in principle) this kind of spherically symmetric embedding of the spatial hyperslices.

== A metric Ansatz ==
The line element given above, with f,g regarded as undetermined functions of the Schwarzschild radial coordinate r, is often used as a metric ansatz in deriving static spherically symmetric solutions in general relativity (or other metric theories of gravitation).

As an illustration, we will indicate how to compute the connection and curvature using Cartan's exterior calculus method. First, we read off the line element a coframe field,
$$\begin{align}
\sigma^0 &= -a(r) \, dt \\
\sigma^1 &= b(r) \, dr \\
\sigma^2 &= r d\theta \\
\sigma^3 &= r \sin\theta \, d\phi
\end{align}$$
where we regard $a \, b$ are as yet undetermined smooth functions of $r$. (The fact that our spacetime admits a frame having this particular trigonometric form is yet another equivalent expression of the notion of a Schwarzschild chart in a static, spherically symmetric Lorentzian manifold).

Second, we compute the exterior derivatives of these cobasis one-forms:
$$\begin{align}
d\sigma^0 &= -a'(r) \, dr \wedge dt \\&= \frac{a'(r)}{b(r)} \, dt \wedge \sigma^1 \\[1ex]
d\sigma^1 &= 0\, \\[1ex]
d\sigma^2 &= dr \wedge d\theta \\[1ex]
d\sigma^3 &= \sin\theta \, dr \wedge d\phi + r \, \cos\theta \, d\theta \wedge d\phi \\ &= -\left( \frac{\sin\theta\, d\phi}{b(r)} \wedge \sigma^1 +  \cos\theta \, d\phi \wedge \sigma^2\right)
\end{align}$$
Comparing with Cartan's first structural equation (or rather its integrability condition),
$$d\sigma^\hat{m} = -{\omega^\hat{m}}_\hat{n} \, \wedge \sigma^\hat{n}$$
we guess expressions for the connection one-forms. (The hats are just a notational device for reminding us that the indices refer to our cobasis one-forms, not to the coordinate one-forms $dt, \, dr, \, d\theta, d\phi$.)

If we recall which pairs of indices are symmetric (space-time) and which are antisymmetric (space-space) in ${\omega^\hat{m}}_\hat{n}$, we can confirm that the six connection one-forms are
$$\begin{align}
{\omega^0}_1 &= \frac{a'}{b}(r)\, dt, &
{\omega^0}_2 &= 0, &
{\omega^0}_3 &= 0, \\
{\omega^1}_2 &= -\frac{d\theta}{b(r)}, &
{\omega^1}_3 &= -\frac{\sin\theta \, d\phi}{b(r)}, &
{\omega^2}_3 &= -\cos\theta \, d\phi,
\end{align}$$
(In this example, only four of the six are nonvanishing.) We can collect these one-forms into a matrix of one-forms, or even better an SO(1,3)-valued one-form. Note that the resulting matrix of one-forms will not quite be antisymmetric as for an SO(4)-valued one-form; we need to use instead a notion of transpose arising from the Lorentzian adjoint.

Third, we compute the exterior derivatives of the connection one-forms and use Cartan's second structural equation
$${\Omega^\hat{m}}_\hat{n} = d{\omega^\hat{m}}_\hat{n} - {\omega^\hat{m}}_\hat{\ell} \wedge {\omega^\hat{\ell}}_\hat{n}$$
to compute the curvature two forms. Fourth, using the formula
$${\Omega^\hat{m}}_\hat{n} = {R^\hat{m}}_{\hat{n}|\hat{\imath}\hat{\jmath}|} \, \sigma^\hat{\imath} \wedge \sigma^\hat{\jmath}$$
where the Bach bars indicate that we should sum only over the six increasing pairs of indices (i,j), we can read off the linearly independent components of the Riemann tensor with respect to our coframe and its dual frame field. We obtain:
$$\begin{align}
{R^0}_{101} &= \frac{-a'' \, b + a' \, b'}{a \, b^3}(r) \\
{R^0}_{202} &= \frac{1}{r}\frac{-a'}{a \, b^2}(r) = {R^0}_{303} \\
{R^1}_{212} &= \frac{1}{r}\frac{b'}{b^3}(r) = {R^1}_{313} \\
{R^2}_{323} &= \frac{1}{r^2}\frac{b^2 - 1}{b^2}(r)
\end{align}$$

Fifth, we can lower indices and organize the components $R_{\hat{m}\hat{n}\hat{i}\hat{j}}$ into a matrix
$$\begin{bmatrix}R_{0101} & R_{0102} & R_{0103} & R_{0123} & R_{0131} & R_{0112} \\ R_{0201} & R_{0202} & R_{0203} & R_{0223} & R_{0231} & R_{0212} \\ R_{0301} & R_{0302} & R_{0303} & R_{0323} & R_{0331} & R_{0312} \\ R_{2301} & R_{2302} & R_{2303} & R_{2323} & R_{2331} & R_{2312} \\ R_{3101} & R_{3102} & R_{3103} & R_{3123} & R_{3131} & R_{3112} \\ R_{1201} & R_{1202} & R_{1203} & R_{1223} & R_{1231} & R_{1212} \end{bmatrix} = \begin{bmatrix} E & B \\ B^T & L \end{bmatrix}$$
where E,L are symmetric (six linearly independent components, in general) and B is traceless (eight linearly independent components, in general), which we think of as representing a linear operator on the six-dimensional vector space of two forms (at each event). From this we can read off the Bel decomposition with respect to the timelike unit vector field $\vec{X} = \vec{e}_0 = \frac{1}{a(r)} \, \partial_t$. The electrogravitic tensor is
$$E[\vec{X}]_{11} = \frac{a'' \, b - a' \, b'}{a \, b^3}(r), \; E[\vec{X}]_{22} = E[\vec{X}]_{33} = \frac{1}{r}\frac{a'}{a \, b^2}(r)$$
The magnetogravitic tensor vanishes identically, and the topogravitic tensor, from which (using the fact that $\vec{X}$ is irrotational) we can determine the three-dimensional Riemann tensor of the spatial hyperslices, is
$$L[\vec{X}]_{11} = \frac{1}{r^2}\frac{1-b^2}{b^2}(r), \; L[\vec{X}]_{22} = L[\vec{X}]_{33} = \frac{1}{r}\frac{-b'}{b^3}(r)$$

This is all valid for any Lorentzian manifold, but we note that in general relativity, the electrogravitic tensor controls tidal stresses on small objects, as measured by the observers corresponding to our frame, and the magnetogravitic tensor controls any spin-spin forces on spinning objects, as measured by the observers corresponding to our frame.

The dual frame field of our coframe field is
$$\begin{align}
\vec{e}_0 &= \frac{1}{a(r)} \, \partial_t \\
\vec{e}_1 &= \frac{1}{b(r)} \, \partial_r \\
\vec{e}_2 &= \frac{1}{r} \, \partial_\theta \\
\vec{e}_3 &= \frac{1}{r \sin\theta} \, \partial_\phi
\end{align}$$
The fact that the factor $\frac{1}{b(r)}$ only multiplies the first of the three orthonormal spacelike vector fields here means that Schwarzschild charts are not spatially isotropic (except in the trivial case of a locally flat spacetime); rather, the light cones appear (radially flattened) or (radially elongated). This is of course just another way of saying that Schwarzschild charts correctly represent distances within each nested round sphere, but the radial coordinate does not faithfully represent radial proper distance.

== Some exact solutions admitting Schwarzschild charts ==
Some examples of exact solutions which can be obtained in this way include:

- the exterior region of the Schwarzschild vacuum,
- ditto, for the Reissner–Nordström electrovacuum, which includes the previous example as a special case,
- ditto, for the Reissner–Nordström–de Sitter electrolambdavacuum, which includes the previous example as a special case,
- the Janis-Newman-Winacour solution (which models the exterior of a static spherically symmetric object endowed with a massless minimally coupled scalar field),
- stellar models obtained by matching an interior region which is a static spherically symmetric perfect fluid solution across a spherical locus of vanishing pressure to an exterior region, which is locally isometric to part of the Schwarzschild vacuum region.

== Generalizations ==
It is natural to consider nonstatic but spherically symmetric spacetimes, with a generalized Schwarzschild chart in which the metric takes the form
$$g = -a(t,r)^2 \, dt^2 + b(t,r)^2 \, dr^2 + r^2 \left( d\theta^2 + \sin^2\theta \, d\phi^2 \right),$$
$$\begin{align}-\infty &< t < \infty, &\, r_0 &< r < r_1, \,\\ 0 &< \theta < \pi, &\, -\pi &< \phi < \pi\end{align}$$

Generalizing in another direction, we can use other coordinate systems on our round two-spheres, to obtain for example a stereographic Schwarzschild chart which is sometimes useful:
$$g = -a(r)^2 \, dt^2 + b(r)^2 \, dr^2 + \frac{dx^2 + dy^2}{(1+x^2+y^2)^2}, \;
\begin{align} -\infty &< t,x,y < \infty,\\ r_1 &< r < r_2 \end{align}$$

== See also ==
- static spacetime,
- spherically symmetric spacetime,
- static spherically symmetric perfect fluids,
- isotropic coordinates, another popular chart for static spherically symmetric spacetimes,
- Gaussian polar coordinates, a less common alternative chart for static spherically symmetric spacetimes,
- Gullstrand–Painlevé coordinates, a simple chart that's valid inside the event horizon of a static black hole.
- frame fields in general relativity, for more about frame fields and coframe fields,
- Bel decomposition of the Riemann tensor,
- congruence (general relativity), for more about congruences such as $\vec{X}$ above,
- Kruskal–Szekeres coordinates, a chart covering the entire spacetime manifold of the maximally extended Schwarzschild solution and are well-behaved everywhere outside the physical singularity,
- Eddington–Finkelstein coordinates, an alternative chart for static spherically symmetric spacetimes,
- Lemaître coordinates, an earliest chart which is regular at the event horizon.
