= Photon surface =

Surface of a black hole

Photon sphere (definition):
A photon sphere of a static spherically symmetric metric is a timelike hypersurface $\{r=r_{ps}\}$ if the deflection angle of a light ray with the closest distance of approach $r_o$ diverges as $r_o \rightarrow r_{ps}.$

For a general static spherically symmetric metric

$$g = - \beta\left(r\right) dt^2 - \alpha(r) dr^2 - \sigma(r) r^2 (d\theta^2 + \sin^2\theta d\phi^2),$$

the photon sphere equation is:

$$2\sigma(r) \beta + r \frac{d\sigma(r)}{dr} \beta(r) - r \frac{d\beta(r)}{dr} \sigma(r) = 0.$$

The concept of a photon sphere in a static spherically metric generalizes to a photon surface of any metric.

Photon surface (definition) :
A photon surface of (M,g) is an immersed, nowhere spacelike hypersurface S of (M, g) such that, for every point p∈S and every null vector k∈T_{p}S, there exists a null geodesic ${\gamma}$:(-ε,ε)→M of (M,g) such that ${\dot{\gamma}}$(0)=k, |γ|⊂S.

Both definitions give the same result for a general static spherically symmetric metric.

Theorem:
Subject to an energy condition, a black hole in any spherically symmetric spacetime must be surrounded by a photon sphere. Conversely, subject to an energy condition, any photon sphere must cover more than a certain amount of matter, a black hole, or a naked singularity.
