= Spherically symmetric spacetime =

Geometric system used in black hole physics

In physics, spherically symmetric spacetimes are commonly used to obtain analytic and numerical solutions to Einstein's field equations in the presence of radially moving matter or energy. Because spherically symmetric spacetimes are by definition irrotational, they are not realistic models of black holes in nature. However, their metrics are considerably simpler than those of rotating spacetimes, making them much easier to analyze.

Spherically symmetric models are not entirely inappropriate: many of them have Penrose diagrams similar to those of rotating spacetimes, and these typically have qualitative features (such as Cauchy horizons) that are unaffected by rotation. One such application is the study of mass inflation due to counter-moving streams of infalling matter in the interior of a black hole.

== Formal definition ==
A spherically symmetric spacetime is a spacetime whose isometry group contains a subgroup which is isomorphic to the rotation group SO(3) and the orbits of this group are 2-spheres (ordinary 2-dimensional spheres in 3-dimensional Euclidean space). The isometries are then interpreted as rotations and a spherically symmetric spacetime is often described as one whose metric is "invariant under rotations". The spacetime metric induces a metric on each orbit 2-sphere (and this induced metric must be a multiple of the metric of a 2-sphere). Conventionally, the metric on the 2-sphere is written in polar coordinates as

$$g_\Omega = d\theta^2 + \sin^2\theta \, d\varphi^2$$,

and so the full metric includes a term proportional to this.

Spherical symmetry is a characteristic feature of many solutions of Einstein's field equations of general relativity, especially the Schwarzschild solution and the Reissner–Nordström solution. A spherically symmetric spacetime can be characterised in another way, namely, by using the notion of Killing vector fields, which, in a very precise sense, preserve the metric. The isometries referred to above are actually local flow diffeomorphisms of Killing vector fields and thus generate these vector fields. For a spherically symmetric spacetime $M$, there are precisely 3 rotational Killing vector fields. Stated in another way, the dimension of the Killing algebra $K(M)$ is 3; that is, $\dim K(M) = 3$. In general, none of these are time-like, as that would imply a static spacetime.

It is known (see Birkhoff's theorem) that any spherically symmetric solution of the vacuum field equations is necessarily isometric to a subset of the maximally extended Schwarzschild solution. This means that the exterior region around a spherically symmetric gravitating object must be static and asymptotically flat.

== Spherically symmetric metrics ==
Conventionally, one uses spherical coordinates $x^\mu=(t, r, \theta, \phi)$, to write the metric (the line element). Several coordinate charts are possible; these include:

- Schwarzschild coordinates
- Isotropic coordinates, in which light cones are round, and thus useful for studying null dusts.
- Gaussian polar coordinates, sometimes used for studying static spherically symmetric perfect fluids.
- Circumferential radius, given below, convenient for studying mass inflation.

== Circumferential radius metric ==
One popular metric, used in the study of mass inflation, is

$$ds^2 = g_{\mu\nu} dx^\mu dx^\nu = - \frac{dt^2}{\alpha^2} +\frac{1}{\beta_r^2}\left(dr-\beta_t\frac{dt}{\alpha} \right)^2  + r^2\, g(\Omega).$$

Here, $g(\Omega)$ is the standard metric on the unit radius 2-sphere $\Omega = (\theta, \phi)$. The radial coordinate $r$ is defined so that it is the circumferential radius, that is, so that the proper circumference at radius $r$ is $2\pi r$. In this coordinate choice, the parameter $\beta_t$ is defined so that $\beta_t=dr/d\tau$ is the proper rate of change of the circumferential radius (that is, where $\tau$ is the proper time). The parameter $\beta_r$ can be interpreted as the radial derivative of the circumferential radius in a freely-falling frame; this becomes explicit in the tetrad formalism.

=== Orthonormal tetrad formalism ===
Note that the above metric is written as a sum of squares, and therefore it can be understood as explicitly encoding a vierbein, and, in particular, an orthonormal tetrad. That is, the metric tensor can be written as a pullback of the Minkowski metric $\eta_{ij}$:

$$g_{\mu\nu} = \eta_{ij} \, e^i_{\;\mu} \, e^j_{\;\nu}$$

where the $e^i_{\;\mu}$ is the inverse vierbein. The convention here and in what follows is that the roman indexes refer to the flat orthonormal tetrad frame, while the greek indexes refer to the coordinate frame. The inverse vierbein can be directly read off of the above metric as

$$e^t_{\;\mu} dx^\mu=\frac{dt}{\alpha}$$
$$e^r_{\;\mu} dx^\mu=\frac{1}{\beta_r}\left(dr-\beta_t\frac{dt}{\alpha} \right)$$
$$e^\theta_{\;\mu} dx^\mu=r d\theta$$
$$e^\phi_{\;\mu} dx^\mu=r\sin\theta d\phi$$

where the signature was take to be $(-+++)$. Written as a matrix, the inverse vierbein is

$$e^i_{\;\mu}=\begin{bmatrix}
\frac{1}{\alpha} & 0 & 0 & 0 \\
-\frac{\beta_t}{\alpha\beta_r} & \frac{1}{\beta_r} & 0 & 0 \\
0 & 0 & r & 0 \\
0 & 0 & 0 & r\sin \theta \\
\end{bmatrix}$$

The vierbein itself is the inverse(-transpose) of the inverse vierbein

$$e_i^{\;\mu}=\begin{bmatrix}
\alpha & \beta_t & 0 & 0 \\
0 & \beta_r & 0 & 0 \\
0 & 0 & \frac{1}{r} & 0 \\
0 & 0 & 0 & \frac{1}{r\sin \theta} \\
\end{bmatrix}$$

That is, $(e^i_{\;\mu})^T e_i^{\;\nu}=e_\mu^{\;\;i} e_i^{\;\nu}=\delta^\nu_\mu$ is the identity matrix.

The particularly simple form of the above is a prime motivating factor for working with the given metric.

The vierbein relates vector fields in the coordinate frame to vector fields in the tetrad frame, as

$$\partial_i=e_i^{\;\mu}\frac {\partial\;\;}{\partial x^\mu}$$

The most interesting of these two are $\partial_t$ which is the proper time in the rest frame, and $\partial_r$ which is the radial derivative in the rest frame. By construction, as noted earlier, $\beta_t$ was the proper rate of change of the circumferential radius; this can now be explicitly written as

$$\beta_t=\partial_t r$$

Similarly, one has

$$\beta_r=\partial_r r$$

which describes the gradient (in the free-falling tetrad frame) of the circumferential radius along the radial direction. This is not in general unity; compare, for example, to the standard Swarschild solution, or the Reissner–Nordström solution. The sign of $\beta_r$ effectively determines "which way is down"; the sign of $\beta_r$ distinguishes incoming and outgoing frames, so that $\beta_r>0$ is an ingoing frame, and $\beta_r< 0$ is an outgoing frame.

These two relations on the circumferential radius provide another reason why this particular parameterization of the metric is convenient: it has a simple intuitive characterization.

=== Connection form ===
The connection form in the tetrad frame can be written in terms of the Christoffel symbols $\Gamma_{ijk}$ in the tetrad frame, which are given by

$$\Gamma_{rtt} = -\partial_r\ln\alpha$$
$$\Gamma_{rtr} = -\beta_t\frac{\partial\ln\alpha}{\partial r} + \frac{\partial\beta_t}{\partial r}-\partial_t\ln\beta_r$$
$$\Gamma_{\theta t\theta} = \Gamma_{\phi t\phi} = \frac{\beta_t}{r}$$
$$\Gamma_{\theta r\theta} = \Gamma_{\phi r\phi} = \frac{\beta_r}{r}$$
$$\Gamma_{\phi\theta\phi} = \frac{\cot\theta}{r}$$

and all others zero.

=== Einstein equations ===
A complete set of expressions for the Riemann tensor, the Einstein tensor and the Weyl curvature scalar can be found in Hamilton & Avelino. The Einstein equations become

$$\nabla_t\beta_t=-\frac{M}{r^2}-4\pi rp$$
$$\nabla_t\beta_r=4\pi rf$$

where $\nabla_t$ is the covariant time derivative (and $\nabla$ the Levi-Civita connection), $p$ the radial pressure (not the isotropic pressure!), and $f$ the radial energy flux. The mass $M(r)$ is the Misner-Thorne mass or interior mass, given by

$$\frac{2M}{r}-1=\beta_t^2-\beta_r^2$$

As these equations are effectively two-dimensional, they can be solved without overwhelming difficulty for a variety of assumptions about the nature of the infalling material (that is, for the assumption of a spherically symmetric black hole that is accreting charged or neutral dust, gas, plasma or dark matter, of high or low temperature, i.e. material with various equations of state.)

== See also ==
- Static spacetime
- Stationary spacetime
- Spacetime symmetries
- De Sitter space
