= Tov =

Tov or TOV may refer to:

- Tales of Vesperia, a video game which is the tenth mothership title in the Tales series.
- Treaty of Versailles, one of the treaties that ended World War I.
- Tolman–Oppenheimer–Volkoff equation, describing hydrostatic equilibrium in general relativity
  - Tolman–Oppenheimer–Volkoff limit, the maximum mass of a neutron star, derived from the equation
- The Hebrew word meaning "good"

- Mazel tov, a Hebrew expression meaning congratulations

- Töv, one of the 21 provinces of Mongolia
- TOV (Ukrainian: Товариство з обмеженою відповідальністю), a type of legal entity in Ukraine
