= Static spherically symmetric perfect fluid =

Class of exact solutions to the Einstein field equations

In metric theories of gravitation, particularly general relativity, a static spherically symmetric perfect fluid (ssspf) solution is a spacetime equipped with suitable tensor fields which models a static round ball of a fluid with isotropic pressure.

Such solutions are often used as idealized models of stars, especially compact objects such as white dwarfs and especially neutron stars. In general relativity, a model of an isolated star (or other fluid ball) generally consists of a fluid-filled interior region, which is technically a perfect fluid solution of the Einstein field equation, and an exterior region, which is an asymptotically flat vacuum solution. These two pieces must be carefully matched across the world sheet of a spherical surface, the surface of zero pressure. (There are various mathematical criteria called matching conditions for checking that the required matching has been successfully achieved.) Similar statements hold for other metric theories of gravitation, such as the Brans–Dicke theory.

== Short history ==
We list here a few milestones in the history of exact ssspf solutions in general relativity:

- 1916: Schwarzschild fluid solution,
- 1939: The relativistic equation of hydrostatic equilibrium, the Oppenheimer-Volkov equation, is introduced,
- 1939: Tolman gives seven ssspf solutions, two of which are suitable for stellar models,
- 1949: Wyman ssspf and first generating function method,
- 1958: Buchdahl ssspf, a relativistic generalization of a Newtonian polytrope,
- 1967: Kuchowicz ssspf,
- 1969: Heintzmann ssspf,
- 1978: Goldman ssspf,
- 1982: Stewart ssspf,
- 1998: major reviews by Finch & Skea and by Delgaty & Lake,
- 2000: Fodor shows how to generate ssspf solutions using one generating function and differentiation and algebraic operations, but no integrations,
- 2001: Nilsson & Ugla reduce the definition of ssspf solutions with either linear or polytropic equations of state to a system of regular ODEs suitable for stability analysis,
- 2002: Rahman & Visser give a generating function method using one differentiation, one square root, and one definite integral, in isotropic coordinates, with various physical requirements satisfied automatically, and show that every ssspf can be put in Rahman-Visser form,
- 2003: Lake extends the long-neglected generating function method of Wyman, for either Schwarzschild coordinates or isotropic coordinates,
- 2004: Martin & Visser algorithm, another generating function method which uses Schwarzschild coordinates,
- 2004: Martin gives three simple new solutions, one of which is suitable for stellar models,
- 2005: BVW algorithm, apparently the simplest variant now known
