= Stationary spacetime =

Spacetime that admits a Killing vector that is asymptotically timelike

In general relativity, specifically in the Einstein field equations, a spacetime is said to be stationary if it admits a Killing vector that is asymptotically timelike.

== Description and analysis ==
In a stationary spacetime, the metric tensor components, $g_{\mu\nu}$, may be chosen so that they are all independent of the time coordinate. The line element of a stationary spacetime has the form $(i,j = 1,2,3)$

$$ds^{2} = \lambda (dt - \omega_{i}\, dy^i)^{2} - \lambda^{-1} h_{ij}\, dy^i\,dy^j,$$

where $t$ is the time coordinate, $y^{i}$ are the three spatial coordinates and $h_{ij}$ is the metric tensor of 3-dimensional space. In this coordinate system the Killing vector field $\xi^{\mu}$ has the components $\xi^{\mu} = (1,0,0,0)$. $\lambda$ is a positive scalar representing the norm of the Killing vector, i.e., $\lambda = g_{\mu\nu}\xi^{\mu}\xi^{\nu}$, and $\omega_{i}$ is a 3-vector, called the twist vector, which vanishes when the Killing vector is hypersurface orthogonal. The latter arises as the spatial components of the twist 4-vector $\omega_{\mu} = e_{\mu\nu\rho\sigma}\xi^{\nu}\nabla^{\rho}\xi^{\sigma}$(see, for example, p. 163) which is orthogonal to the Killing vector $\xi^{\mu}$, i.e., satisfies $\omega_{\mu} \xi^{\mu} = 0$. The twist vector measures the extent to which the Killing vector fails to be orthogonal to a family of 3-surfaces. A non-zero twist indicates the presence of rotation in the spacetime geometry.

The coordinate representation described above has an interesting geometrical interpretation. The time translation Killing vector generates a one-parameter group of motion $G$ in the spacetime $M$. By identifying the spacetime points that lie on a particular trajectory (also called orbit) one gets a 3-dimensional space (the manifold of Killing trajectories) $V= M/G$, the quotient space. Each point of $V$ represents a trajectory in the spacetime $M$. This identification, called a canonical projection, $\pi : M \rightarrow V$ is a mapping that sends each trajectory in $M$ onto a point in $V$ and induces a metric $h = -\lambda \pi*g$ on $V$ via pullback. The quantities $\lambda$, $\omega_{i}$ and $h_{ij}$ are all fields on $V$ and are consequently independent of time. Thus, the geometry of a stationary spacetime does not change in time. In the special case $\omega_{i} = 0$ the spacetime is said to be static. By definition, every static spacetime is stationary, but the converse is not generally true, as the Kerr metric provides a counterexample.

== Use as starting point for vacuum field equations ==
In a stationary spacetime satisfying the vacuum Einstein equations $R_{\mu\nu} = 0$ outside the sources, the twist 4-vector $\omega_{\mu}$ is curl-free,

$$\nabla_\mu \omega_\nu - \nabla_\nu \omega_\mu = 0,\,$$

and is therefore locally the gradient of a scalar $\omega$ (called the twist scalar):

$$\omega_\mu = \nabla_\mu \omega.\,$$

Instead of the scalars $\lambda$ and $\omega$ it is more convenient to use the two Hansen potentials, the mass and angular momentum potentials, $\Phi_{M}$ and $\Phi_{J}$, defined as

$$\Phi_{M} = \frac{1}{4}\lambda^{-1}(\lambda^{2} + \omega^{2} -1),$$
$$\Phi_{J} = \frac{1}{2}\lambda^{-1}\omega.$$

In general relativity the mass potential $\Phi_{M}$ plays the role of the Newtonian gravitational potential. A nontrivial angular momentum potential $\Phi_{J}$ arises for rotating sources due to the rotational kinetic energy which, because of mass–energy equivalence, can also act as the source of a gravitational field. The situation is analogous to a static electromagnetic field where one has two sets of potentials, electric and magnetic. In general relativity, rotating sources produce a gravitomagnetic field that has no Newtonian analog.

A stationary vacuum metric is thus expressible in terms of the Hansen potentials $\Phi_{A}$ ($A=M$, $J$) and the 3-metric $h_{ij}$. In terms of these quantities the Einstein vacuum field equations can be put in the form

$$(h^{ij}\nabla_i \nabla_j - 2R^{(3)})\Phi_A = 0,\,$$
$$R^{(3)}_{ij} = 2[\nabla_{i}\Phi_{A}\nabla_{j}\Phi_{A} - (1+ 4 \Phi^{2})^{-1}\nabla_{i}\Phi^{2}\nabla_{j}\Phi^{2}],$$

where $\Phi^{2} = \Phi_{A}\Phi_{A} = (\Phi_{M}^{2} + \Phi_{J}^{2})$, and $R^{(3)}_{ij}$ is the Ricci tensor of the spatial metric and $R^{(3)} = h^{ij}R^{(3)}_{ij}$ the corresponding Ricci scalar. These equations form the starting point for investigating exact stationary vacuum metrics.

== See also ==
- Static spacetime
- Spherically symmetric spacetime
