= Hans Reissner =

German engineer and mathematician (1874–1967)

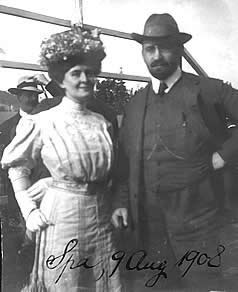
Hans Reissner and his wife, Josefine.

Hans Jacob Reissner, also known as Jacob Johannes Reissner (18 January 1874, Berlin – 2 October 1967, Mt. Angel, Oregon), was a German aeronautical engineer whose avocation was mathematical physics. During World War I he was awarded the Iron Cross second class (for civilians) for his pioneering work on aircraft design.

== Biography ==
Reissner was born into a wealthy Berlin family that benefited from an inheritance from his great-uncle on his mother's side. As a young engineering graduate, he spent a year in the U.S. working as a draftsman. After this year, he broadened his academic interests to include physics. As a young academic, he published mathematical papers on engineering problems.

Before World War I, Reissner designed the first successful all-metal aircraft, the Reissner Canard (or Ente) with both skin and structure made of metal. This was constructed with assistance from Hugo Junkers who had previously shown little interest in aviation. Both were professors at the University of Aachen. The first flight was made on May 23, 1912, with Robert Gsell at the controls.

During the Nazi regime Reissner was able to work in the aircraft industry although he did not have an Aryan certificate. In 1935 he lost his post at Technische Universität Berlin due to his Jewish ancestry, and in 1938 he emigrated to the United States. He taught at the Illinois Institute of Technology (1938–44) and the Polytechnic Institute of Brooklyn (1944–54).

It was this engineer, rather than a physicist or mathematician, who first solved Einstein's equation for the metric of a charged point mass. His closed-form solution, rediscovered by several other physicists within the next few years, is now called the Reissner–Nordström metric.

Eric Reissner (Max Erich Reissner, 1913–1996), his son, developed Mindlin–Reissner plate theory.
