= Tolman–Oppenheimer–Volkoff equation =

Equation explaining structure of a spherical body of isotropic material

In astrophysics, the Tolman–Oppenheimer–Volkoff (TOV) equation constrains the structure of a spherically symmetric body of isotropic material which is in static gravitational equilibrium, as modeled by general relativity. The equation is

$$\frac{dP}{dr}=-\frac{G m}{r^2}\rho\left(1+\frac{P}{\rho c^2}\right)\left(1+\frac{4\pi r^3P}{mc^2}\right)\left(1-\frac{2Gm}{rc^2}\right)^{-1}$$

Here, $r$ is a radial coordinate, and $\rho(r)$ and $P(r)$ are the density and pressure, respectively, of the material at radius $r$. The quantity $m(r)$, the total mass within $r$, is discussed below.

The equation is derived by solving the Einstein equations for a general time-invariant, spherically symmetric metric. For a solution to the Tolman–Oppenheimer–Volkoff equation, this metric will take the form

$$ds^2=e^{\nu} c^2 \,dt^2 - \left(1-\frac{2Gm}{rc^2}\right)^{-1} \,dr^2 - r^2\left(d\theta^2 + \sin^2 \theta \,d\phi^2\right)$$

where $\nu (r)$ is determined by the constraint

$$\frac{d\nu}{dr}=- \left(\frac{2}{P+\rho c^2} \right) \frac{dP}{dr}$$

When supplemented with an equation of state, $F(\rho,P)=0$, which relates density to pressure, the Tolman–Oppenheimer–Volkoff equation completely determines the structure of a spherically symmetric body of isotropic material in equilibrium. If terms of order $1/c^2$ are neglected, the Tolman–Oppenheimer–Volkoff equation becomes the Newtonian hydrostatic equation, used to find the equilibrium structure of a spherically symmetric body of isotropic material when general-relativistic corrections are not important.

If the equation is used to model a bounded sphere of material in a vacuum, the zero-pressure condition $P(r)=0$ and the condition $e^{\nu} = 1 - 2 G m/c^2 r$ should be imposed at the boundary. The second boundary condition is imposed so that the metric at the boundary is continuous with the unique static spherically symmetric solution to the vacuum field equations, the Schwarzschild metric:

$$ds^2=\left(1-\frac{2GM}{rc^2}\right) c^2 \,dt^2 - \left(1-\frac{2GM}{rc^2}\right)^{-1} \,dr^2 - r^2(d\theta^2 + \sin^2 \theta \,d\phi^2)$$

== Total mass ==
Let $m(r)$ be the total mass contained inside radius $r$, as measured by the gravitational field felt by a distant observer. It satisfies $m(0) = 0$.

$$\frac{dm}{dr}=4 \pi r^2 \rho$$

Here, $M$ is the total mass of the object, again, as measured by the gravitational field felt by a distant observer. If the boundary is at $r = R$, continuity of the metric and the definition of $m(r)$ require that

$$M=m(R)=\int_0^{R} 4\pi r^2 \rho \, dr$$

Computing the mass by integrating the density of the object over its volume, on the other hand, will yield the larger value

$$M_1=\int_0^{R} \frac{4\pi r^2 \rho}{\sqrt{1-\frac{2Gm}{rc^2}}} \, dr$$

The difference between these two quantities,

$$\Delta M=\int_0^{R} 4\pi r^2 \rho \left(1-\frac{1}\sqrt{1-\frac{2Gm}{rc^2}}\right) \, dr,$$

will be the gravitational binding energy of the object divided by $c^2$ and it is negative.

== Derivation from general relativity ==
Let us assume a static, spherically symmetric perfect fluid. The metric components are similar to those for the Schwarzschild metric:

$$c^2 \,d\tau^2 = g_{\mu\nu} \,dx^\mu \,dx^\nu = e^{\nu} c^2 \,dt^2 - e^{\lambda} \,dr^2 - r^2 \,d\theta^2 - r^2 \sin^2 \theta \,d\phi^2$$

By the perfect fluid assumption, the stress-energy tensor is diagonal (in the central spherical coordinate system), with eigenvalues of energy density and pressure:

$$T_0^0 = \rho c^2$$

and

$$T_i^j = - P \delta_i^j$$

Where $\rho(r)$ is the fluid density and $P(r)$ is the fluid pressure.

To proceed further, we solve Einstein's field equations:

$$\frac{8 \pi G}{c^4} T_{\mu\nu} = G_{\mu\nu}$$

Let us first consider the $G_{00}$ component:

$$\frac{8 \pi G}{c^4} \rho c^2 e^\nu = \frac{e^\nu}{r^2} \left(1 - \frac{d}{dr} [r e^{-\lambda}] \right)$$

Integrating this expression from 0 to $r$, we obtain

$$e^{-\lambda} =  1 - \frac{2 Gm}{r c^2}$$

where $m(r)$ is as defined in the previous section.

Next, consider the $G_{11}$ component. Explicitly, we have

$$- \frac{8 \pi G}{c^4} P e^{\lambda} = \frac{- r \nu' + e^{\lambda} - 1}{r^2}$$

which we can simplify (using our expression for $e^{\lambda}$) to

$$\frac{d \nu}{d r} = \frac{1}{r}\left(1 - \frac{2 G m}{c^2 r}\right)^{-1} \left(\frac{2 G m}{c^2 r} + \frac{8 \pi G}{c^4} r^2 P\right)$$

We obtain a second equation by demanding continuity of the stress-energy tensor: $\nabla_{\mu} T^{\mu}_{\,\nu} = 0$. Observing that $\partial_t \rho = \partial_t P = 0$ (since the configuration is assumed to be static) and that $\partial_{\phi} P = \partial_{\theta} P = 0$ (since the configuration is also isotropic), we obtain in particular

$$0 = \nabla_\mu T^\mu_1 = - \frac{d P}{d r} - \frac12 \left(P + \rho c^2\right) \frac{d\nu}{d r} \;$$

Rearranging terms yields:

$$\frac{dP}{dr} = - \left( \frac{\rho c^2 + P}{2} \right) \frac{d\nu}{dr} \;$$

This gives us two expressions, both containing $d\nu/dr$. Eliminating $d\nu/dr$, we obtain:

$$\frac{dP}{dr} = - \frac{1}{r} \left( \frac{\rho c^2 + P}{2} \right) \left(\frac{2 G m}{c^2 r} + \frac{8 \pi G}{c^4} r^2 P\right) \left(1 - \frac{2 G m}{c^2 r}\right)^{-1}$$

Pulling out a factor of $G/r$ and rearranging factors of 2 and $c^2$ results in the Tolman–Oppenheimer–Volkoff equation:

$\frac{dP}{dr} = - \frac{G}{r^2} \left( \rho + \frac{P}{c^2} \right) \left(m + 4 \pi r^3 \frac{P}{c^2} \right) \left( 1 - \frac{2 G m}{c^2 r} \right)^{-1}$

== History ==
Richard C. Tolman analyzed spherically symmetric metrics in 1934 and 1939. The form of the equation given here was derived by J. Robert Oppenheimer and George Volkoff in their 1939 paper, "On Massive Neutron Cores". In this paper, the equation of state for a degenerate Fermi gas of neutrons was used to calculate an upper limit of ~0.7 solar masses for the gravitational mass of a neutron star. Since this equation of state is not realistic for a neutron star, this limiting mass is likewise incorrect. Using gravitational wave observations from binary neutron star mergers (like GW170817) and the subsequent information from electromagnetic radiation (kilonova), the data suggest that the maximum mass limit is close to 2.17 solar masses. Earlier estimates for this limit range from 1.5 to 3.0 solar masses.

== Post-Newtonian approximation ==
In the post-Newtonian approximation, i.e., gravitational fields that slightly deviates from Newtonian field, the equation can be expanded in powers of $1/c^2$. In other words, we have

$$\frac{dP}{dr}=-\frac{G m}{r^2}\rho\left(1+\frac{P}{\rho c^2}+\frac{4\pi r^3P}{mc^2}+\frac{2Gm}{rc^2}\right) + O(c^{-4}).$$

== See also ==
- Chandrasekhar's white dwarf equation
- Hydrostatic equation
- Tolman–Oppenheimer–Volkoff limit
- Solutions of the Einstein field equations
- Static spherically symmetric perfect fluid
