= Newtonian gauge =

Topic in general relativity

In general relativity, the Newtonian gauge is a perturbed form of the Friedmann–Lemaître–Robertson–Walker line element. The gauge freedom of general relativity is used to eliminate two scalar degrees of freedom of the metric, so that it can be written as:

$$ds^2 =-(1+2\Phi)dt^2+a^2(t)(1-2\Psi)\delta_{ab}dx^adx^b,$$

where the Latin indices a and b are summed over the spatial directions and $\delta_{ab}$ is the Kronecker delta. We can instead make use of conformal time as the time component yielding the longitudinal or conformal Newtonian gauge:

$$ds^2 =a^2(\tau)[-(1+2\Phi)d\tau^2+(1-2\Psi)\delta_{ab}dx^adx^b]$$

which is related by the simple transformation $dt=a(t)d\tau$. They are called Newtonian gauges because $\Psi$ is the Newtonian gravitational potential of classical Newtonian gravity, which satisfies the Poisson equation $\nabla^2\Psi=4\pi G\rho$ for non-relativistic matter and on scales where the expansion of the universe may be neglected. It includes only scalar perturbations of the metric: by the scalar-vector-tensor decomposition these evolve independently of the vector and tensor perturbations and are the predominant ones affecting the growth of structure in the universe in cosmological perturbation theory. The vector perturbations vanish in cosmic inflation and the tensor perturbations are gravitational waves, which have a negligible effect on physics except for the so-called B-modes of the cosmic microwave background polarization. The tensor perturbation is truly gauge independent, since it is the same in all gauges.

In a universe without anisotropic stress (that is, where the stress–energy tensor is invariant under spatial rotations, or the three principal pressures are identical) the Einstein equations sets $\Phi=\Psi$.
