= Isotropic coordinates =

Coordinate system used to represent certain spacetimes

In the theory of Lorentzian manifolds, spherically symmetric spacetimes admit a family of nested round spheres. There are several different types of coordinate chart which are adapted to this family of nested spheres; the best known is the Schwarzschild chart, but the isotropic chart is also often useful. The defining characteristic of an isotropic chart is that its radial coordinate (which is different from the radial coordinate of a Schwarzschild chart) is defined so that light cones appear round. This means that (except in the trivial case of a locally flat manifold), the angular isotropic coordinates do not faithfully represent distances within the nested spheres, nor does the radial coordinate faithfully represent radial distances. On the other hand, angles in the constant time hyperslices are represented without distortion, hence the name of the chart.

Isotropic charts are most often applied to static spherically symmetric spacetimes in metric theories of gravitation such as general relativity, but they can also be used in modeling a spherically pulsating fluid ball, for example. For isolated spherically symmetric solutions of the Einstein field equation, at large distances, the isotropic and Schwarzschild charts become increasingly similar to the usual polar spherical chart on Minkowski spacetime.

== Definition ==
In an isotropic chart (on a static spherically symmetric spacetime), the metric (a.k.a. line element) takes the form

$$g = -a(r)^2 \, dt^2 + b(r)^2 \, \left( dr^2 + r^2 \, \left( d\theta^2 + \sin(\theta)^2 \, d\varphi^2 \right) \right),$$
$$-\infty < t < \infty, \, r_0 < r < r_1, \, 0 < \theta < \pi, \, -\pi < \varphi < \pi$$

Depending on context, it may be appropriate to regard $a, \, b$ as undetermined functions of the radial coordinate (for example, in deriving an exact static spherically symmetric solution of the Einstein field equation). Alternatively, we can plug in specific functions (possibly depending on some parameters) to obtain an isotropic coordinate chart on a specific Lorentzian spacetime.

== Killing vector fields ==
The Lie algebra of Killing vector fields of a spherically symmetric static spacetime takes the same form in the isotropic chart as in the Schwarzschild chart. Namely, this algebra is generated by the timelike irrotational Killing vector field

$$\partial_t$$

and three spacelike Killing vector fields

$$\partial_\varphi$$
$$\sin(\varphi) \, \partial_\theta + \cot(\theta) \, \cos(\varphi) \partial_\varphi$$
$$\cos(\varphi) \, \partial_\theta - \cot(\theta) \, \sin(\varphi) \partial_\varphi$$

Here, saying that $\vec{X} = \partial_t$ is irrotational means that the vorticity tensor of the corresponding timelike congruence vanishes; thus, this Killing vector field is hypersurface orthogonal. The fact that the spacetime admits an irrotational timelike Killing vector field is in fact the defining characteristic of a static spacetime. One immediate consequence is that the constant time coordinate surfaces $t=t_0$ form a family of (isometric) spatial hyperslices (spacelike hypersurfaces).

Unlike the Schwarzschild chart, the isotropic chart is not well suited for constructing embedding diagrams of these hyperslices.

== A family of static nested spheres ==
The surfaces $t=t_0, \, r=r_0$ appear as round spheres (when we plot loci in polar spherical fashion), and from the form of the line element, we see that the metric restricted to any of these surfaces is

$$g|_{t = t_0, r = r_0} = b(r_0)^2 \, r_0^2g_\Omega = b(r_0)^2 \, r_0^2 \, \left( d\theta^2 + \sin(\theta)^2 \, d\varphi^2 \right), \; 0 < \theta < \pi, -\pi < \varphi < \pi$$

where $\Omega = (\theta, \varphi)$ are coordinates and $g_\Omega$ is the Riemannian metric on the 2 sphere of unit radius. That is, these nested coordinate spheres do in fact represent geometric spheres, but the appearance of $b(r_0) \, r$ rather than $r$ shows that the radial coordinate do not correspond to area in the same way as for spheres in ordinary euclidean space. Compare Schwarzschild coordinates, where the radial coordinate does have its natural interpretation in terms of the nested spheres.

== Coordinate singularities ==
The loci $\varphi=-\pi, \, \pi$ mark the boundaries of the isotropic chart, and just as in the Schwarzschild chart, we tacitly assume that these two loci are identified, so that our putative round spheres are indeed topological spheres.

Just as for the Schwarzschild chart, the range of the radial coordinate may be limited if the metric or its inverse blows up for some value(s) of this coordinate.

== A metric Ansatz ==
The line element given above, with f,g, regarded as undetermined functions of the isotropic coordinate r, is often used as a metric Ansatz in deriving static spherically symmetric solutions in general relativity (or other metric theories of gravitation).

As an illustration, we will sketch how to compute the connection and curvature using Cartan's exterior calculus method. First, we read off the line element a coframe field,

$$\sigma^0 = -a(r) \, dt$$
$$\sigma^1 = b(r) \, dr$$
$$\sigma^2 = b(r) \, r \, d\theta$$
$$\sigma^3 = b(r) \, r \, \sin(\theta) \, d\varphi$$

where we regard $a, \,b$ as undetermined smooth functions of $r$. (The fact that our spacetime admits a frame having this particular trigonometric form is yet another equivalent expression of the notion of an isotropic chart in a static, spherically symmetric Lorentzian manifold). Taking the exterior derivatives and using the first Cartan structural equation, we find the nonvanishing connection one-forms

$${\omega^0}_1 = \frac{f' \, dt}{g}$$
$${\omega^1}_2 = -\left( 1 + \frac{r \, b'}{b} \right) \, d\theta$$
$${\omega^1}_3 = -\left( 1 + \frac{r \, b'}{b} \right) \, \sin(\theta) \, d\varphi$$
$${\omega^2}_3 = -\cos(\theta) \, d\varphi$$

Taking exterior derivatives again and plugging into the second Cartan structural equation, we find the curvature two-forms.

== See also ==
- Static spacetime
- Spherically symmetric spacetime
- Static spherically symmetric perfect fluids
- Schwarzschild coordinates, another popular chart for static spherically symmetric spacetimes
- Frame fields in general relativity, for more about frame fields and coframe fields
