= Reissner–Nordström metric =

Exact solution in general relativity

In physics and astronomy, the Reissner–Nordström metric is a static solution to the Einstein–Maxwell field equations that corresponds to the gravitational field of a charged, non-rotating, spherically symmetric body of mass $M$. The analogous solution for a charged, rotating body is given by the Kerr–Newman metric.

The metric was discovered between 1916 and 1921 by Hans Reissner, Hermann Weyl, Gunnar Nordström and George Barker Jeffery independently.

== Metric ==
In spherical coordinates $(t, r, \theta, \varphi)$, the Reissner–Nordström metric (i.e. the line element) is

$ds^2$ $= c^2\, d\tau^2$ $= \left( 1 - \frac{r_\text{s}}{r} + \frac{r_{\rm Q}^2}{r^2} \right) c^2\, dt^2$ $-\left( 1 - \frac{r_\text{s}}{r} + \frac{r_Q^2}{r^2} \right)^{-1} \, dr^2$ $- ~ r^2 \, d\theta^2$ $- ~ r^2\sin^2\theta \, d\varphi^2 ,$

where

- $c$ is the speed of light
- $\tau$ is the proper time
- $t$ is the time coordinate (measured by a stationary clock at infinity).
- $r$ is the radial coordinate
- $(\theta, \varphi)$ are the spherical angles
- $r_\text{s}$ is the Schwarzschild radius of the body given by $\textstyle r_\text{s} = \frac{2GM}{c^2}$
- $r_Q$ is a characteristic length scale given by $\textstyle r_Q^2 = \frac{Q^2 G}{4\pi\varepsilon_0 c^4}$
- $\varepsilon_0$ is the electric constant.

The total mass of the central body and its irreducible mass are related by

$$M_{\rm irr}= \frac{c^2}{G} \sqrt{\frac{r_+^2}{2}} \ \to \ M=\frac{Q ^2}{16\pi\varepsilon_0 G M_{\rm irr}} + M_{\rm irr}.$$

The difference between $M$ and $M_{\rm irr}$ is due to the equivalence of mass and energy, which makes the electric field energy also contribute to the total mass.

In the limit that the charge $Q$ (or equivalently, the length scale $r_Q$) goes to zero, one recovers the Schwarzschild metric. The classical Newtonian theory of gravity may then be recovered in the limit as the ratio $r_\text{s}/r$ goes to zero. In the limit that both $r_Q/r$ and $r_\text{s}/r$ go to zero, the metric becomes the Minkowski metric for special relativity.

In practice, the ratio $r_\text{s}/r$ is often extremely small. For example, the Schwarzschild radius of the Earth is roughly 9 mm. Even at the surface of the Earth, the corrections to Newtonian gravity are only one part in a billion. The ratio only becomes large close to black holes and other ultra-dense objects such as neutron stars.

The classical form of the metric is supposed to receive quantum corrections if quantum gravitational effects are taken into account.

== Charged black holes ==
Although charged black holes with $r_Q \ll r_S$ are similar to the Schwarzschild black hole, they have two horizons: the event horizon and an internal Cauchy horizon. As with the Schwarzschild metric, the event horizons for the spacetime are located where the metric component $g_{rr}$ diverges; that is, where
$$1 - \frac{r_{\rm s}}{r} + \frac{r_{\rm Q}^2}{r^2} = -\frac{1}{g_{rr}} = 0.$$

This equation has two solutions:
$$r_\pm = \frac{1}{2}\left(r_{\rm s} \pm \sqrt{r_{\rm s}^2 - 4r_{\rm Q}^2}\right).$$

These concentric event horizons become degenerate for $2r_Q = r_S$, which corresponds to an extremal black hole. Black holes with $2r_Q > r_S$ have no event horizon (the term under the square root becomes negative) and would display a naked singularity. According to the weak cosmic censorship hypothesis, naked singularity cannot exist in nature. Theories with supersymmetry usually guarantee that such "superextremal" black holes cannot exist.

The electromagnetic potential is
$$A_\alpha = (Q/r, 0, 0, 0).$$

If magnetic monopoles are included in the theory, then a generalization to include magnetic charge $P$ is obtained by replacing $Q^2$ by $Q^2 + P^2$ in the metric and including the term $P \cos \theta \, d\varphi$ in the electromagnetic potential.

== Gravitational time dilation ==
The gravitational time dilation in the vicinity of the central body is given by
$$\gamma = \sqrt{|g^{t t}|} = \sqrt{\frac{r^2}{Q^2+(r-2 M) r}} ,$$
which relates to the local radial escape velocity of a neutral particle
$$v_{\rm esc}=\frac{\sqrt{\gamma^2-1}}{\gamma}.$$

== Christoffel symbols ==
The Christoffel symbols
$$\Gamma^i{}_{j k} = \sum_{s=0}^3 \ \frac{g^{is}}{2} \left(\frac{\partial g_{js}}{\partial x^k}+\frac{\partial g_{sk}}{\partial x^j}-\frac{\partial g_{jk}}{\partial x^s}\right)$$
with the indices
$$\{ 0, \ 1, \ 2, \ 3 \} \to \{ t, \ r, \ \theta, \ \varphi \}$$
give the non-vanishing expressions
$$\begin{align}
\Gamma^t{}_{t r} & = \frac{M r-Q^2}{r ( Q^2 + r^2 - 2 M r ) } \\[6pt]
\Gamma^r{}_{t t} & = \frac{(M r-Q^2) \left(r^2-2Mr+Q^2\right)}{r^5} \\[6pt]
\Gamma^r{}_{r r} & = \frac{Q^2-M r}{r (Q^2 -2 M r+r^2)} \\[6pt]
\Gamma^r{}_{\theta \theta} & = -\frac{r^2-2Mr+Q^2}{r} \\[6pt]
\Gamma^r{}_{\varphi \varphi} & = -\frac{\sin ^2 \theta \left(r^2-2Mr+Q^2\right)}{r} \\[6pt]
\Gamma^\theta{}_{\theta r} & = \frac{1}{r} \\[6pt]
\Gamma^\theta{}_{\varphi \varphi} & = - \sin \theta \cos \theta \\[6pt]
\Gamma^\varphi{}_{\varphi r} & = \frac{1}{r} \\[6pt]
\Gamma^\varphi{}_{\varphi \theta} & = \cot \theta
\end{align}$$

Given the Christoffel symbols, one can compute the geodesics of a test-particle.

== Tetrad form ==
Instead of working in the holonomic basis, one can perform efficient calculations with a tetrad. Let ${\bf e}_I = e_{\mu I}$ be a set of one-forms with internal Minkowski index $I \in\{0,1,2,3\}$, such that $\eta^{IJ} e_{\mu I} e_{\nu J} = g_{\mu\nu}$. The Reissner metric can be described by the tetrad

$${\bf e}_0 = G^{1/2} \, dt$$
$${\bf e}_1 = G^{-1/2} \, dr$$
$${\bf e}_2 = r \, d\theta$$
$${\bf e}_3 = r \sin \theta \, d\varphi$$

where $G(r) = 1 - r_sr^{-1} + r_Q^2r^{-2}$. The parallel transport of the tetrad is captured by the connection one-forms $\boldsymbol \omega_{IJ} = - \boldsymbol \omega_{JI} = \omega_{\mu IJ} = e_{I}^\nu \nabla_\mu e_{J\nu}$. These have only 24 independent components compared to the 40 components of $\Gamma^\lambda{}_{\mu\nu}$. The connections can be solved for by inspection from Cartan's equation $d{\bf e}_I = {\bf e}^J \wedge \boldsymbol \omega_{IJ}$, where the left hand side is the exterior derivative of the tetrad, and the right hand side is a wedge product.

$$\boldsymbol \omega_{10} = \frac12 \partial_r G \, dt$$
$$\boldsymbol \omega_{20} = \boldsymbol \omega_{30} = 0$$
$$\boldsymbol \omega_{21} = - G^{1/2} \, d\theta$$
$$\boldsymbol \omega_{31} = - \sin \theta \, G^{1/2} \, d \varphi$$
$$\boldsymbol \omega_{32} = - \cos \theta \, d\varphi$$

The Riemann tensor ${\bf R}_{IJ} = R_{\mu\nu IJ}$ can be constructed as a collection of two-forms by the second Cartan equation ${\bf R}_{IJ} = d \boldsymbol \omega_{IJ} + \boldsymbol \omega_{IK} \wedge \boldsymbol \omega^K{}_J,$ which again makes use of the exterior derivative and wedge product. This approach is significantly faster than the traditional computation with $\Gamma^\lambda{}_{\mu\nu}$; note that there are only four nonzero $\boldsymbol \omega_{IJ}$ compared with nine nonzero components of $\Gamma^\lambda{}_{\mu\nu}$.

== Equations of motion ==
Because of the spherical symmetry of the metric, the coordinate system can always be aligned in a way that the motion of a test-particle is confined to a plane. For brevity and without loss of generality one may use $\theta$ instead of $\varphi$. In dimensionless natural units of $G = M = c = K = 1$, the motion of an electrically charged particle with the charge $q$ is given by
$$\ddot x^i = - \sum_{j=0}^3 \ \sum_{k=0}^3 \ \Gamma^i_{j k} \ {\dot x^j} \ {\dot x^k} + q \ {F^{i k}} \ {\dot x_k}$$
which yields
$$\ddot t =  \frac{ \ 2 (Q^2-Mr) }{r(r^2 -2Mr +Q ^2)}\dot{r}\dot{t}+\frac{qQ}{(r^2-2mr+Q^2)} \ \dot{r}$$
$$\ddot r = \frac{(r^2-2Mr+Q^2)(Q^2-Mr) \ \dot{t}^2}{r^5}+\frac{(Mr-Q^2) \dot{r}^2}{r(r^2-2Mr+Q^2)}+\frac{(r^2-2Mr+Q^2) \ \dot{\theta}^2}{r} + \frac{qQ(r^2-2mr+Q^2)}{r^4} \ \dot{t}$$
$$\ddot \theta = -\frac{2 \ \dot\theta \ \dot{r}}{r} .$$

All total derivatives are with respect to proper time $\dot a=\frac{da}{d\tau}$.

Constants of the motion are provided by solutions $S (t,\dot t,r,\dot r,\theta,\dot\theta,\varphi,\dot\varphi)$ to the partial differential equation
$$0=\dot t\dfrac{\partial S}{\partial t}+\dot r\frac{\partial S}{\partial r}+\dot\theta\frac{\partial S}{\partial\theta}+\ddot t \frac{\partial S}{\partial \dot t} +\ddot r \frac{\partial S}{\partial \dot r} + \ddot\theta \frac{\partial S}{\partial \dot\theta}$$
after substitution of the second derivatives given above. The metric itself is a solution when written as a differential equation
$$S_1=1 =
\left( 1 - \frac{r_s}{r} + \frac{r_{\rm Q}^2}{r^2} \right) c^2\, {\dot t}^2 -\left( 1 - \frac{r_s}{r} + \frac{r_Q^2}{r^2} \right)^{-1} \, {\dot r}^2 - r^2 \, {\dot \theta}^2 .$$

The separable equation
$$\frac{\partial S}{\partial r}-\frac{2}{r}\dot\theta\frac{\partial S}{\partial \dot\theta}=0$$
immediately yields the constant relativistic specific angular momentum
$$S_2=L=r^2\dot\theta;$$
a third constant obtained from
$$\frac{\partial S}{\partial r}-\frac{2(Mr-Q^2)}{r(r^2-2Mr+Q^2)}\dot t\frac{\partial S}{\partial \dot t}=0$$
is the specific energy (energy per unit rest mass)
$$S_3=E=\frac{\dot t(r^2-2Mr+Q^2)}{r^2} + \frac{qQ}{r} .$$

Substituting $S_2$ and $S_3$ into $S_1$ yields the radial equation
$$c\int d\tau =\int \frac{r^2\,dr}{ \sqrt{r^4(E-1)+2Mr^3-(Q^2+L^2)r^2+2ML^2r-Q^2L^2 } } .$$

Multiplying under the integral sign by $S_2$ yields the orbital equation
$$c\int Lr^2\,d\theta =\int \frac{L\,dr}{ \sqrt{r^4(E-1)+2Mr^3-(Q^2+L^2)r^2+2ML^2r-Q^2L^2 }  }.$$

The total time dilation between the test-particle and an observer at infinity is
$$\gamma= \frac{q \  Q  \ r^3 + E \ r^4}{r^2 \ (r^2-2 r+Q^2)} .$$

The first derivatives $\dot x^i$ and the contravariant components of the local 3-velocity $v^i$ are related by
$$\dot x^i = \frac{v^i}{\sqrt{(1-v^2) \ |g_{i i}|}},$$
which gives the initial conditions
$$\dot r = \frac{v_\parallel \sqrt{r^2-2M+Q^2}}{r \sqrt{(1-v^2)}}$$
$$\dot \theta = \frac{v_\perp}{r \sqrt{(1-v^2)}} .$$

The specific orbital energy
$$E=\frac{\sqrt{Q^2-2rM+r^2}}{r \sqrt{1-v^2}}+\frac{qQ}{r}$$
and the specific relative angular momentum
$$L=\frac{v_\perp \ r}{\sqrt{1-v^2}}$$
of the test-particle are conserved quantities of motion. $v_{\parallel}$ and $v_{\perp}$ are the radial and transverse components of the local velocity-vector. The local velocity is therefore
$$v = \sqrt{v_\perp^2+v_\parallel^2} = \sqrt{\frac{(E^2-1)r^2-Q^2-r^2+2rM}{E^2 r^2}}.$$

== Alternative formulation of metric ==
The metric can be expressed in Kerr–Schild form as follows:
$$\begin{align}
g_{\mu \nu} & = \eta_{\mu \nu} + fk_\mu k_\nu \\[5pt]
f & = \frac{G}{r^2}\left[2Mr - Q^2 \right] \\[5pt]
\mathbf{k} & = ( k_x ,k_y ,k_z ) = \left( \frac{x}{r} , \frac{y}{r}, \frac{z}{r} \right) \\[5pt]
k_0 & = 1.
\end{align}$$

Here $\mathbf{k}$ is a unit vector, $M$ is the constant mass of the object, $Q$ is the constant charge of the object, and $\eta$ is the Minkowski tensor.
