= Asymptotically flat spacetime =

Lorentzian manifold where curvature vanishes at large distances

An asymptotically flat spacetime is a Lorentzian manifold in which, roughly speaking, the curvature vanishes at large distances from some region, so that at large distances, the geometry becomes indistinguishable from that of Minkowski spacetime.

While this notion makes sense for any Lorentzian manifold, it is most often applied to a spacetime standing as a solution to the field equations of some metric theory of gravitation, particularly general relativity. In this case, we can say that an asymptotically flat spacetime is one in which the gravitational field, as well as any matter or other fields which may be present, become negligible in magnitude at large distances from some region. In particular, in an asymptotically flat vacuum solution, the gravitational field (curvature) becomes negligible at large distances from the source of the field (typically some isolated massive object such as a star).

== Intuitive significance ==
The condition of asymptotic flatness is analogous to similar conditions in mathematics and in other physical theories. Such conditions say that some physical field or mathematical function is asymptotically vanishing in a suitable sense.

In general relativity, an asymptotically flat vacuum solution models the exterior gravitational field of an isolated massive object. Therefore, such a spacetime can be considered as an isolated system: a system in which exterior influences can be neglected. Indeed, physicists rarely imagine a universe containing a single star and nothing else when they construct an asymptotically flat model of a star. Rather, they are interested in modeling the interior of the star together with an exterior region in which gravitational effects due to the presence of other objects can be neglected. Since typical distances between astrophysical bodies tend to be much larger than the diameter of each body, we often can get away with this idealization, which usually helps to greatly simplify the construction and analysis of solutions.

== Formal definitions ==
A manifold $M$ is asymptotically simple if it admits a conformal compactification $\widetilde{M}$ such that every null geodesic in $M$ has future and past endpoints on the boundary of $\widetilde{M}$.

Since the latter excludes black holes, one defines a weakly asymptotically simple manifold as a manifold $M$ with an open set $U\subset M$ isometric to a neighborhood of the boundary of $\widetilde{M}$, where $\widetilde{M}$ is the conformal compactification of some asymptotically simple manifold $M$.

A manifold is asymptotically flat if it is weakly asymptotically simple and asymptotically empty in the sense that its Ricci tensor vanishes in a neighborhood of the boundary of $\widetilde{M}$.

== Some examples and nonexamples ==
Only spacetimes which model an isolated object are asymptotically flat. Many other familiar exact solutions, such as the FRW models, are not.

A simple example of an asymptotically flat spacetime is the Schwarzschild metric solution. More generally, the Kerr metric is also asymptotically flat. But another well known generalization of the Schwarzschild vacuum, the Taub–NUT space, is not asymptotically flat. An even simpler generalization, the de Sitter-Schwarzschild metric solution, which models a spherically symmetric massive object immersed in a de Sitter universe, is an example of an asymptotically simple spacetime which is not asymptotically flat.

On the other hand, there are important large families of solutions which are asymptotically flat, such as the AF Weyl metrics and their rotating generalizations, the AF Ernst vacuums (the family of all stationary axisymmetric and asymptotically flat vacuum solutions). These families are given by the solution space of a much simplified family of partial differential equations, and their metric tensors can be written down in terms of an explicit multipole expansion.

== A coordinate-dependent definition ==
The simplest (and historically the first) way of defining an asymptotically flat spacetime assumes that we have a coordinate chart, with coordinates $t,x,y,z$, which far from the origin behaves much like a Cartesian chart on Minkowski spacetime, in the following sense. Write the metric tensor as the sum of a (physically unobservable) Minkowski background plus a perturbation tensor, $g_{ab} = \eta_{ab} + h_{ab}$, and set $r^2=x^2+y^2+z^2$. Then we require:

- $\lim_{r \rightarrow \infty} h_{ab} = O(1/r)$
- $\lim_{r \rightarrow \infty} h_{ab,p} = O(1/r^2)$
- $\lim_{r \rightarrow \infty} h_{ab,pq} = O(1/r^3)$

One reason why we require the partial derivatives of the perturbation to decay so quickly is that these conditions turn out to imply that the gravitational field energy density (to the extent that this somewhat nebulous notion makes sense in a metric theory of gravitation) decays like $O(1/r^4)$, which would be physically sensible. (In classical electromagnetism, the energy of the electromagnetic field of a point charge decays like $O(1/r^4)$.)

== A coordinate-free definition ==
Around 1962, Hermann Bondi, Rainer K. Sachs, and others began to study the general phenomenon of radiation from a compact source in general relativity, which requires more flexible definitions of asymptotic flatness. In 1963, Roger Penrose imported from algebraic geometry the essential innovation, now called conformal compactification, and in 1972, Robert Geroch used this to circumvent the tricky problem of suitably defining and evaluating suitable limits in formulating a truly coordinate-free definition of asymptotic flatness. In the new approach, once everything is properly set up, one need only evaluate functions on a locus in order to verify asymptotic flatness.

== Applications ==
The notion of asymptotic flatness is extremely useful as a technical condition in the study of exact solutions in general relativity and allied theories. There are several reasons for this:

- Models of physical phenomena in general relativity (and allied physical theories) generally arise as the solution of appropriate systems of differential equations, and assuming asymptotic flatness provides boundary conditions which assist in setting up and even in solving the resulting boundary value problem.
- In metric theories of gravitation such as general relativity, it is usually not possible to give general definitions of important physical concepts such as mass and angular momentum; however, assuming asymptotical flatness allows one to employ convenient definitions which do make sense for asymptotically flat solutions.
- While this is less obvious, it turns out that invoking asymptotic flatness allows physicists to import sophisticated mathematical concepts from algebraic geometry and differential topology in order to define and study important features such as event horizons which may or may not be present.

== See also ==
- Fluid solution
- Einstein field equations
