= Static spacetime =

Spacetime that does not change over time and is irrotational

In general relativity, a spacetime is said to be static if it does not change over time and is also irrotational. It is a special case of a stationary spacetime, which is the geometry of a stationary spacetime that does not change in time but can rotate. Thus, the Kerr solution provides an example of a stationary spacetime that is not static; the non-rotating Schwarzschild solution is an example that is static.

Formally, a spacetime is static if it admits a global, non-vanishing, timelike Killing vector field $K$ that is irrotational, i.e., whose orthogonal distribution is involutive. (Note that the leaves of the associated foliation are necessarily space-like hypersurfaces.) Thus, a static spacetime is a stationary spacetime satisfying this additional integrability condition. These spacetimes form one of the simplest classes of Lorentzian manifolds.

Locally, every static spacetime looks like a standard static spacetime that is a Lorentzian warped product $R \times S$ with a metric of the form

$$g[(t,x)] = -\beta(x) dt^{2} + g_{S}[x],$$

where $R$ is the real line, $g_{S}$ is a (positive definite) metric and $\beta$ is a positive function on the Riemannian manifold $S$.

In such a local coordinate representation the Killing field $K$ may be identified with $\partial_t$ and S, the manifold of $K$-trajectories, may be regarded as the instantaneous 3-space of stationary observers. If $\lambda$ is the square of the norm of the Killing vector field, $\lambda = g(K,K)$, both $\lambda$ and $g_S$ are independent of time (in fact $\lambda = - \beta(x)$). It is from the latter fact that a static spacetime obtains its name, as the geometry of the space-like slice $S$ does not change over time.

== Examples of static spacetimes ==
- The (exterior) Schwarzschild solution
- De Sitter space (the portion of it covered by the static patch)
- Reissner–Nordström space
- The Weyl solution, a static axisymmetric solution of the Einstein vacuum field equations $R_{\mu\nu} = 0$ discovered by Hermann Weyl

== Examples of non-static spacetimes ==
In general, "almost all" spacetimes will not be static. Some explicit examples include:

- Spherically symmetric spacetimes, which are irrotational but not static
- The Kerr solution, a stationary spacetime that is not static
- Spacetimes with gravitational waves, which are not even stationary.
