= Outline of black holes =

Overview of and topical guide to black holes

The following outline is provided as an overview of and topical guide to black holes:

Black hole – mathematically defined region of spacetime exhibiting such a strong gravitational pull that no particle or electromagnetic radiation can escape from inside it. The theory of general relativity predicts that a sufficiently compact mass can deform spacetime to form a black hole. The boundary of the region from which no escape is possible is called the event horizon. Although crossing the event horizon has enormous effect on the fate of the object crossing it, it appears to have no locally detectable features. In many ways a black hole acts like an ideal black body, as it reflects no light. Moreover, quantum field theory in curved spacetime predicts that event horizons emit Hawking radiation, with the same spectrum as a black body of a temperature inversely proportional to its mass. This temperature is on the order of billionths of a kelvin for black holes of stellar mass, making them essentially impossible to observe.

== What black holes can be classified as ==
A black hole can be described as all of the following:

- Astronomical object
  - Black body
  - Collapsed star

== Types of black holes ==
- Schwarzschild metric – In Einstein's theory of general relativity, the Schwarzschild solution, named after Karl Schwarzschild, describes the gravitational field outside a spherical, uncharged, non-rotating mass such as a star, planet, or black hole.
- Rotating black hole – black hole that possesses spin angular momentum.
- Charged black hole – black hole that possesses electric charge.
- Virtual black hole – black hole that exists temporarily as a result of a quantum fluctuation of spacetime.

=== Types of black holes, by size ===
- Micro black hole – predicted as tiny black holes, also called quantum mechanical black holes, or mini black holes, for which quantum mechanical effects play an important role. These could potentially have arisen as primordial black holes.
- Extremal black hole – black hole with the minimal possible mass that can be compatible with a given charge and angular momentum.
  - Black hole electron – if there were a black hole with the same mass and charge as an electron, it would share many of the properties of the electron including the magnetic moment and Compton wavelength.
- Stellar black hole – black hole formed by the gravitational collapse of a massive star. They have masses ranging from about three to several tens of solar masses.
- Intermediate-mass black hole – black hole whose mass is significantly more than stellar black holes yet far less than supermassive black holes.
- Supermassive black hole – largest type of black hole in a galaxy, on the order of hundreds of thousands to billions of solar masses.
- Quasar – very energetic and distant active galactic nucleus.
  - Active galactic nucleus – compact region at the centre of a galaxy that has a much higher than normal luminosity over at least some portion, and possibly all, of the electromagnetic spectrum.
  - Blazar – very compact quasar associated with a presumed supermassive black hole at the center of an active, giant elliptical galaxy.

== Specific black holes ==
- List of black holes – incomplete list of black holes organized by size; some items in this list are galaxies or star clusters that are believed to be organized around a black hole.

== Black hole exploration ==
- Rossi X-ray Timing Explorer – satellite that observes the time structure of astronomical X-ray sources, named after Bruno Rossi.

== Formation of black holes ==
- Stellar evolution – process by which a star undergoes a sequence of radical changes during its lifetime.
- Gravitational collapse – inward fall of a body due to the influence of its own gravity.
- Neutron star – type of stellar remnant that can result from the gravitational collapse of a massive star during a Type II, Type Ib or Type Ic supernova event.
- Compact star – white dwarfs, neutron stars, other exotic dense stars, and black holes.
  - Quark star – hypothetical type of exotic star composed of quark matter, or strange matter.
  - Exotic star – compact star composed of something other than electrons, protons, and neutrons balanced against gravitational collapse by degeneracy pressure or other quantum properties.
- Tolman–Oppenheimer–Volkoff limit – upper bound to the mass of stars composed of neutron-degenerate matter.
- White dwarf – also called a degenerate dwarf, is a small star composed mostly of electron-degenerate matter.
- Supernova – stellar explosion that is more energetic than a nova.
- Hypernova – also known as a Type Ic Supernova, refers to an immensely large star that collapses at the end of its lifespan.
- Gamma-ray burst – flashes of gamma rays associated with extremely energetic explosions that have been observed in distant galaxies.

== Properties of black holes ==
- Accretion disk – structure (often a circumstellar disk) formed by diffused material in orbital motion around a massive central body, typically a star. Accretion disks of black holes radiate in the X-ray part of the spectrum.
- Black hole thermodynamics – area of study that seeks to reconcile the laws of thermodynamics with the existence of black hole event horizons.
- Schwarzschild radius – distance from the center of an object such that, if all the mass of the object were compressed within that sphere, the escape speed from the surface would equal the speed of light.
- M–sigma relation – empirical correlation between the stellar velocity dispersion $\sigma$ of a galaxy bulge and the mass M of the supermassive black hole at its center.
- Event horizon – boundary in spacetime beyond which events cannot affect an outside observer.
- Quasi-periodic oscillation – manner in which the X-ray light from an astronomical object flickers about certain frequencies.
- Photon sphere – spherical region of space where gravity is strong enough that photons are forced to travel in orbits.
- Ergosphere – region located outside a rotating black hole.
- Hawking radiation – black-body radiation that is predicted to be emitted by black holes, due to quantum effects near the event horizon.
- Penrose process – process theorised by Roger Penrose wherein energy can be extracted from a rotating black hole.
- Bondi accretion – spherical accretion onto an object.
- Spaghettification – vertical stretching and horizontal compression of objects into long thin shapes in a very strong gravitational field, and is caused by extreme tidal forces.
- Gravitational lens – distribution of matter between a distant source and an observer, that is capable of bending the light from the source, as it travels towards the observer.

== History of black holes ==
History of black holes

- Timeline of black hole physics – Timeline of black hole physics
- John Michell – geologist who first proposed the idea "dark stars" in 1783
  - Dark star
- Pierre-Simon Laplace – early mathematical theorist (1796) of the idea of black holes
- Albert Einstein – in 1915, arrived at the theory of general relativity
- Karl Schwarzschild – described the gravitational field of a point mass in 1915
- Subrahmanyan Chandrasekhar – in 1931, using special relativity, postulated that a non-rotating body of electron-degenerate matter above a certain limiting mass (now called the Chandrasekhar limit at 1.4 solar masses) has no stable solutions.
- Tolman–Oppenheimer–Volkoff limit, a higher limit than the Chandrasekhar limit above which neutron stars would certainly collapse further, was predicted in 1939, along with a description of the mechanism by which a black hole could be produced.
- David Finkelstein – identified the Schwarzschild surface as an event horizon
- Roy Kerr – In 1963, found the exact solution for a rotating black hole
- Stephen Hawking and Roger Penrose show that global singularities can occur and black holes are not a mathematical artifact in the late 1960s.
- Cygnus X-1, discovered in 1964, was the first astrophysical object commonly accepted to be a black hole after further observations in the early 1970s.
- James Bardeen and Jacob Bekenstein formulate black hole thermodynamics alongside Hawking and others in the early 1970s.
- Hawking predicts Hawking radiation in 1974 as a consequence of black hole thermodynamics.
- The LIGO Scientific Collaboration announces the first detection of a black hole merger via gravitational wave observations on February 11, 2016.
- The Event Horizon Telescope observes the supermassive black hole in Messier 87's galactic center in 2017, leading to the first direct image of a black hole being published on April 10, 2019.

== Models of black holes ==
- Gravitational singularity – or spacetime singularity is a location where the quantities that are used to measure the gravitational field become infinite in a way that does not depend on the coordinate system.
  - Penrose–Hawking singularity theorems – set of results in general relativity which attempt to answer the question of when gravitation produces singularities.
- Primordial black hole – hypothetical type of black hole that is formed not by the gravitational collapse of a large star but by the extreme density of matter present during the universe's early expansion.
- Gravastar – object hypothesized in astrophysics as an alternative to the black hole theory by Pawel Mazur and Emil Mottola.
- Dark star (Newtonian mechanics) – theoretical object compatible with Newtonian mechanics that, due to its large mass, has a surface escape velocity that equals or exceeds the speed of light.
- Dark-energy star
- Black star (semiclassical gravity) – gravitational object composed of matter.
- Magnetospheric eternally collapsing object – proposed alternatives to black holes advocated by Darryl Leiter and Stanley Robertson.
- Fuzzball (string theory) – theorized by some superstring theory scientists to be the true quantum description of black holes.
- White hole – hypothetical region of spacetime which cannot be entered from the outside, but from which matter and light have the ability to escape.
- Naked singularity – gravitational singularity without an event horizon.
- Ring singularity – describes the altering gravitational singularity of a rotating black hole, or a Kerr black hole, so that the gravitational singularity becomes shaped like a ring.
- Immirzi parameter – numerical coefficient appearing in loop quantum gravity, a nonperturbative theory of quantum gravity.
- Membrane paradigm – useful "toy model" method or "engineering approach" for visualising and calculating the effects predicted by quantum mechanics for the exterior physics of black holes, without using quantum-mechanical principles or calculations.
- Kugelblitz (astrophysics) – concentration of light so intense that it forms an event horizon and becomes self-trapped: according to general relativity, if enough radiation is aimed into a region, the concentration of energy can warp spacetime enough for the region to become a black hole.
- Wormhole – hypothetical topological feature of spacetime that would be, fundamentally, a "shortcut" through spacetime.
- Quasi-star – hypothetical type of extremely massive star that may have existed very early in the history of the Universe.

== Issues pertaining to black holes ==
- No-hair theorem – postulates that all black hole solutions of the Einstein-Maxwell equations of gravitation and electromagnetism in general relativity can be completely characterized by only three externally observable classical parameters: mass, electric charge, and angular momentum.
- Black hole information paradox – results from the combination of quantum mechanics and general relativity.
- Cosmic censorship hypothesis – two mathematical conjectures about the structure of singularities arising in general relativity.
- Nonsingular black hole models – mathematical theory of black holes that avoids certain theoretical problems with the standard black hole model, including information loss and the unobservable nature of the black hole event horizon.
- Holographic principle – property of quantum gravity and string theories which states that the description of a volume of space can be thought of as encoded on a boundary to the region—preferably a light-like boundary like a gravitational horizon.
- Black hole complementarity – conjectured solution to the black hole information paradox, proposed by Leonard Susskind and Gerard 't Hooft.

== Black hole metrics ==
- Schwarzschild metric – describes the gravitational field outside a spherical, uncharged, non-rotating mass such as a star, planet, or black hole.
- Kerr metric – describes the geometry of empty spacetime around an uncharged, rotating black hole (axially symmetric with an event horizon which is topologically a sphere)
- Reissner–Nordström metric – static solution to the Einstein-Maxwell field equations, which corresponds to the gravitational field of a charged, non-rotating, spherically symmetric body of mass M.
- Kerr-Newman metric – solution of the Einstein–Maxwell equations in general relativity, describing the spacetime geometry in the region surrounding a charged, rotating mass.

== Astronomical objects including a black hole ==
- Hypercompact stellar system – dense cluster of stars around a supermassive black hole that has been ejected from the centre of its host galaxy.

== Persons influential in black hole research ==
- Stephen Hawking
- Jacob Bekenstein - for the foundation of black hole thermodynamics and the elucidation of the relation between entropy and the area of a black hole's event horizon.
- Karl Schwarzschild - found a solution to the equations of general relativity that characterizes a black hole.
- J. Robert Oppenheimer - for the discovery of the Tolman–Oppenheimer–Volkoff limit and his work with Hartland Snyder showing how a black hole could develop.
- Roger Penrose - showed, alongside Hawking, that global singularities can exist.
- Albert Einstein - arrived at the theory of general relativity; published a paper in 1939 arguing black holes cannot actually exist.

== See also ==
- Outline of astronomy
  - Outline of space science
