= Naked singularity =

Hypothetical phenomenon

In general relativity, a naked singularity is a hypothetical gravitational singularity without an event horizon.

When there exists at least one causal geodesic that, in the future, extends either to an observer at infinity or to an observer comoving with the collapsing cloud, and in the past terminates at the gravitational singularity, then that singularity is referred to as a naked singularity. In a black hole, the singularity is completely enclosed by a boundary known as the event horizon, inside which the curvature of spacetime caused by the singularity is so strong that light cannot escape. Hence, objects inside the event horizon—including the singularity itself—cannot be observed directly. In contrast, a naked singularity would be observable.

The theoretical existence of naked singularities is important because their existence would mean that it would be possible to observe the collapse of an object to infinite density. It would also cause foundational problems for general relativity, because general relativity cannot make predictions about the evolution of spacetime near a singularity. In generic black holes, this is not a problem, as an outside viewer cannot observe the spacetime within the event horizon.

Naked singularities have not been observed in nature. Astronomical observations of black holes indicate that their rate of rotation falls below the threshold to produce a naked singularity (spin parameter 1). GRS 1915+105 comes closest to the limit, with a spin parameter of 0.82-1.00. It is hinted that GRO J1655−40 could be a naked singularity.

According to the cosmic censorship hypothesis, gravitational singularities may not be observable. If loop quantum gravity is correct, naked singularities may be possible in nature.

== Predicted formation ==
When a massive star undergoes a gravitational collapse due to its own immense gravity, the ultimate outcome of this persistent collapse can manifest as either a black hole or a naked singularity. This holds true across a diverse range of physically plausible scenarios allowed by general relativity. The Oppenheimer–Snyder–Datt (OSD) model illustrates the collapse of a spherical cloud composed of homogeneous dust (pressureless matter). In this scenario, all the matter converges into the spacetime singularity simultaneously in terms of comoving time. Notably, the event horizon emerges before the singularity, effectively covering it. By allowing an inhomogeneous initial density profile, one can demonstrate a significant alteration in the behavior of the horizon. This leads to two distinct potential outcomes arising from the collapse of generic dust: the formation of a black hole, characterized by the horizon preceding the singularity; or the emergence of a naked singularity, where the horizon is delayed. In the case of a naked singularity, this delay enables null geodesics or light rays to escape the central singularity, where density and curvatures diverge, reaching distant observers. In exploring more realistic scenarios of collapse, one avenue involves incorporating pressures into the model. The consideration of gravitational collapse with non-zero pressures and various models including a realistic equation of state, delineating the specific relationship between the density and pressure within the cloud, has been thoroughly examined and investigated by numerous researchers over the years. They all result in either a black hole or a naked singularity depending on the initial data.

From concepts drawn from rotating black holes, it is shown that a singularity, spinning rapidly, can become a ring-shaped object. This results in two event horizons, as well as an ergosphere, which draw closer together as the spin of the singularity increases. When the outer and inner event horizons merge, they shrink toward the rotating singularity and eventually expose it to the rest of the universe.

A singularity rotating fast enough might be created by the collapse of dust or by a supernova of a fast-spinning star. Studies of pulsars and some computer simulations such as one by Matthew Choptuik in 1997, have been performed. Intriguingly, it is recently reported that some spinning white dwarfs could realistically transmute into rotating naked singularities or black holes with a wide range of near- and sub-solar-mass values by capturing asymmetric dark matter particles. Similarly, spinning neutron stars could also be transmuted to slowly spinning near–solar-mass naked singularities by capturing asymmetric dark matter particles, if the accumulated cloud of dark matter particles in the core of a neutron star can be modeled as an anisotropic fluid. In general, the precession of a gyroscope and the precession of orbits of matter falling into a rotating black hole or a naked singularity can be used to distinguish these exotic objects.

Mathematician Demetrios Christodoulou, a winner of the Shaw Prize, has shown that contrary to what had been expected, singularities which are not hidden in a black hole could also occur. However, he then showed that such "naked singularities" are unstable.

== Metrics ==
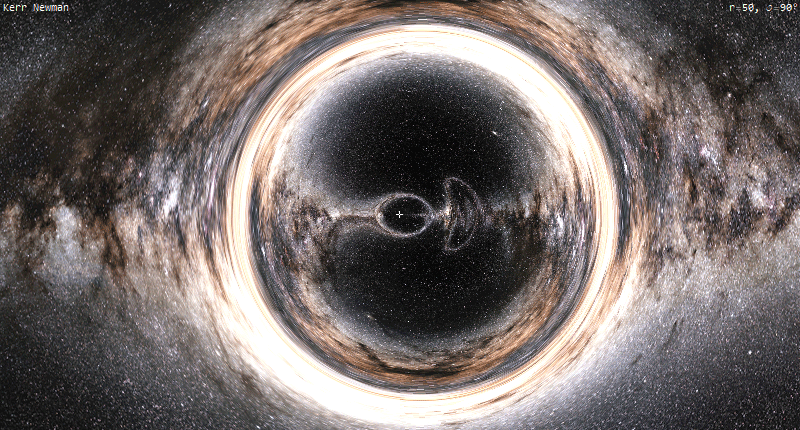
Ray traced image of a hypothetical naked singularity in front of a Milky Way background. The parameters of the singularity are M=1, a²+Q²=2M². The singularity is viewed from its equatorial plane at θ=90° (edge on).

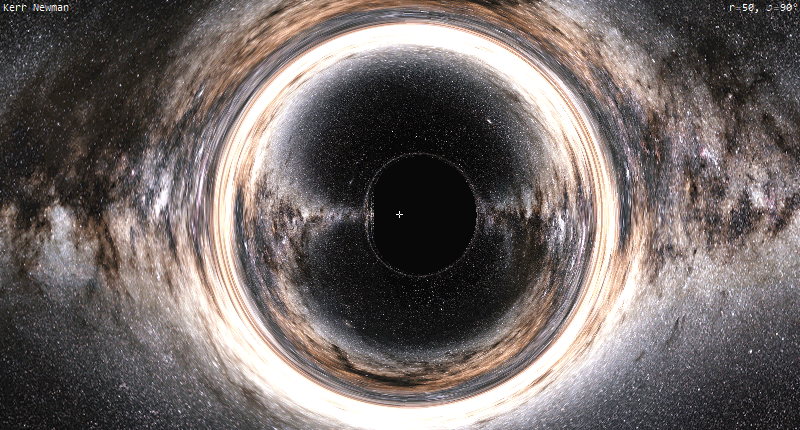
Comparison with an extremal black hole with M=1, a²+Q²=1M²

Disappearing event horizons exist in the Kerr metric, which is a spinning black hole in a vacuum. Specifically, if the angular momentum is high enough, the event horizons could disappear. Transforming the Kerr metric to Boyer–Lindquist coordinates, it can be shown that the $r$ coordinate (which is not the radius) of the event horizon is
$$r_\pm = \mu \pm (\mu^2-a^2)^{1/2},$$
where $\mu = G M / c^2$, and $a=J/M c$. In this case, "event horizons disappear" means that the solutions are complex for $r_\pm$, or $\mu^2 < a^2$. However, this corresponds to a case where $J$ exceeds $GM^{2}/c$ (or in Planck units, $J > M^2$), i.e. the spin exceeds what is normally viewed as the upper limit of its physically possible values.

Disappearing event horizons can also be seen with the Reissner–Nordström geometry of a charged black hole. In this metric, it can be shown that the horizons occur at
$$r_\pm = \mu \pm (\mu^2-q^2)^{1/2},$$
where $\mu = G M / c^2$, and $q^2 = G Q^2/(4 \pi \varepsilon_0 c^4)$. Of the three possible cases for the relative values of $\mu$ and $q$, the case where $\mu^2 < q^2$ causes both $r_\pm$ to be complex. This means the metric is regular for all positive values of $r$, or in other words, the singularity has no event horizon. However, this corresponds to a case where $Q/\sqrt{4 \pi \varepsilon_0}$ exceeds $M\sqrt{G}$ (or in Planck units, $Q > M$), i.e. the charge exceeds what is normally viewed as the upper limit of its physically possible values.

See Kerr–Newman metric for a spinning, charged ring singularity.

== Types ==
=== Globally and locally naked singularities ===
The ring singularity of a Kerr black hole is an example of a locally naked singularity.

Naked singularities can either be globally or locally naked. A globally naked singularity is visible from infinity, while a locally naked singularity is not due to being hidden behind a horizon. In other words, a globally naked singularity can have causal effects on asymptotic regions of spacetime, while a locally naked singularity can only affect a finite region. Globally and locally naked singularities are the focuses of Penrose's weak and strong cosmic censorship hypotheses respectively, which theorize that such singularities do not exist. In 2017, mathematicians Mihalis Dafermos and Jonathan Luk mathematically verified that spacetime continues beyond the inner Cauchy horizon of a black hole, beyond which a locally naked BKL singularity lies, providing a counterexample to the strong version of the cosmic censorship conjecture by mathematically proving a generic condition under which a locally naked singularity could form.

=== Strongly and weakly naked singularities ===
Naked singularities can be strongly or weakly naked. A weakly naked singularity is contained within at least one photon sphere, while a strongly naked singularity is not. The strength of a naked singularity is determined by its scalar charge to mass ratio. When $0<q/M<\sqrt3$, where $q$ is the singularity's charge and $M$ is its mass, the singularity is weakly naked. When $q/M>\sqrt3$, the singularity is strongly naked. When $q/M=\sqrt3$, the singularity is marginally strongly naked and has similar properties to a weakly naked singularity.

Light is lensed differently near a weakly vs strongly naked singularity. Similarly to a Schwarzschild black hole, light around a weakly naked singularity travels around the photon sphere many times, generating many relativistic images around it. On the other hand, having no photon sphere, a strongly naked singularity does not create any lensed relativistic images. Additionally, like a Schwarzschild black hole, a weakly naked singularity has one Einstein ring and no radial critical curve, while a strongly naked singularity has either zero or two Einstein rings and does have a radial critical curve.

== Effects ==
A naked singularity could allow scientists to observe an infinitely dense material, which would under normal circumstances be impossible according to the cosmic censorship hypothesis. That is, without an event horizon of any kind, naked singularities could actually emit light.

== Cosmic censorship hypothesis ==
The cosmic censorship hypothesis says that every gravitational singularity will remain hidden by its event horizon. LIGO events, including GW150914, are consistent with these predictions. Although data anomalies would have resulted in the case of a singularity, the nature of those anomalies remains unknown.

Some research has suggested that if loop quantum gravity is correct, then naked singularities could exist in nature, implying that the cosmic censorship hypothesis does not hold. Numerical calculations and some other arguments have also hinted at this possibility.

== In fiction ==
- M. John Harrison's Kefahuchi Tract trilogy of science fiction novels (Light, Nova Swing and Empty Space) centre upon humanity's exploration of a naked singularity.
- "Dark Peril", by James C. Glass (published in Analog March 2005), is a story about space travelers on an exploratory mission. While they investigate a strange cosmological phenomenon, their two small spacecraft begin to shake, and they are unable to leave the area. One crew member realizes that they are trapped in the ergosphere of a black hole or naked singularity. The story describes a cluster of multiple black holes or singularities, and what the crew does to try to survive this seemingly inescapable situation.
- Stephen Baxter's Xeelee Sequence features the Xeelee, who create a massive ring that produces a naked singularity. It is used to travel to another universe.
- In the episode titled "Daybreak", the finale of the 2004 reimagined television series Battlestar Galactica, the Cylon colony orbits a naked singularity.
- The Sleeping God in Peter Hamilton's The Night's Dawn Trilogy is believed to be a naked singularity.
- In Christopher Nolan's Interstellar the nonexistence of a naked singularity hinders humanity from completing a theory of quantum gravity due to the inaccessibility of experimental data from inside the event horizon.
- In the visual novel Steins;Gate, a naked singularity is used to compress the digitalized memories of the protagonist into a smaller size, to then be sent back in time with an improvised "time leap machine".
- In Vonda McIntyre's 1981 Star Trek novel The Entropy Effect, a naked singularity is found to be a side effect of time travel experimentation, and threatens to destroy the universe if the time travel experiments are not stopped before they started.

== See also ==
- Black hole electron
- Gravitational singularity
- Ring singularity
