= Timeline of black hole physics =

The following timeline outlines notable discoveries in the study of black holes in physics, beginning in the 18th century and continuing to modern observations.

== Pre-20th century ==
- 1640 — Ismaël Bullialdus suggests an inverse-square gravitational force law
- 1676 — Ole Rømer demonstrates that light has a finite speed
- 1684 — Isaac Newton writes down his inverse-square law of universal gravitation
- 1758 — Rudjer Josip Boscovich develops his theory of forces, where gravity can be repulsive on small distances. This implied that strange classical bodies that would not allow other bodies to reach their surfaces, such as what we now call white holes, could exist.
- 1783 – John Michell predicts dark stars. John Michell proposed objects so massive that light could not escape.
- 1784 — John Michell discusses classical bodies which have escape velocities greater than the speed of light
- 1795 — Pierre Laplace discusses classical bodies which have escape velocities greater than the speed of light
- 1798 — Henry Cavendish measures the gravitational constant G
- 1870 — William Kingdon Clifford suggests that the motion of matter may be due to changes in the geometry of space

== 20th century ==
=== Before 1960s ===
- 1909 — Albert Einstein, together with Marcel Grossmann, starts to develop a theory which would bind metric tensor g_{ik}, which defines a space geometry, with a source of gravity, that is with mass
- 1910 — Hans Reissner and Gunnar Nordström define Reissner–Nordström singularity, Hermann Weyl solves special case for a point-body source
- 1915 — Albert Einstein presents (David Hilbert presented this independently five days earlier in Göttingen) the complete Einstein field equations at the Prussian Academy meeting in Berlin on 25 November 1915
- 1916 — Karl Schwarzschild and independently Johannes Droste solve the Einstein vacuum field equations for uncharged spherically symmetric non-rotating systems
- 1917 — Paul Ehrenfest gives conditional principle a three-dimensional space
- 1918 — Hans Reissner and Gunnar Nordström solve the Einstein–Maxwell field equations for charged spherically symmetric non-rotating systems
- 1918 — Friedrich Kottler gets Schwarzschild solution without Einstein vacuum field equations
- 1923 — George David Birkhoff proves that the Schwarzschild spacetime geometry is the unique spherically symmetric solution of the Einstein vacuum field equations
- 1931 — Subrahmanyan Chandrasekhar calculates, using special relativity, that a non-rotating body of electron-degenerate matter above a certain limiting mass (at 1.4 solar masses) has no stable solutions
- 1939 — Robert Oppenheimer and Hartland Snyder calculate the gravitational collapse of a pressure-free homogeneous fluid sphere into a black hole
- 1939 — Using the work of Richard Chace Tolman, Robert Oppenheimer and George Volkoff calculate the upper mass limit of a cold, non-rotating neutron star to be approximately 0.7 solar masses.
- 1958 — David Finkelstein theorises that the Schwarzschild radius is a causality barrier: an event horizon of a black hole

=== 1960s ===
- 1963 — Roy Kerr solves the Einstein vacuum field equations for uncharged symmetric rotating systems, deriving the Kerr metric for a rotating black hole
- 1963 — Maarten Schmidt discovers and analyzes the first quasar, 3C 273, as a highly red-shifted active galactic nucleus, a billion light years away
- 1964 — Yakov Zel'dovich and independently Edwin Salpeter propose that accretion discs around supermassive black holes are responsible for the huge amounts of energy radiated by quasars
- 1964 — Hong-Yee Chiu coins the word quasar for a 'quasi-stellar radio source' in his article in Physics Today
- 1964 — The first recorded use of the term "black hole" in writing, by journalist Ann Ewing
- 1965 — Roger Penrose proves that an imploding star will necessarily produce a singularity once it has formed an event horizon
- 1965 — Ezra T. Newman, E. Couch, K. Chinnapared, A. Exton, A. Prakash, and Robert Torrence solve the Einstein–Maxwell field equations for charged, rotating systems
- 1966 — Yakov Zel'dovich and Igor Novikov propose searching for black hole candidates among binary systems in which one star is optically bright and X-ray dark and the other optically dark but X-ray bright (the black hole candidate)
- 1967 — Jocelyn Bell discovers and analyzes the first radio pulsar, direct evidence for a neutron star
- 1967 — Werner Israel presents the proof of the no-hair theorem at King's College London
- 1967 — John Wheeler introduces the term "black hole" in his lecture to the American Association for the Advancement of Science
- 1968 — Brandon Carter uses Hamilton–Jacobi theory to derive first-order equations of motion for a charged particle moving in the external fields of a Kerr–Newman black hole
- 1969 — Roger Penrose discusses the Penrose process for the extraction of the spin energy from a Kerr black hole
- 1969 — Roger Penrose proposes the cosmic censorship hypothesis

=== After 1960s ===
- 1972 — Identification of Cygnus X-1/HDE 226868 from dynamic observations as the first binary with a stellar black hole candidate
- 1972 — Stephen Hawking proves that the area of a classical black hole's event horizon cannot decrease
- 1972 — James Bardeen, Brandon Carter, and Stephen Hawking propose four laws of black hole mechanics in analogy with the laws of thermodynamics
- 1972 — Jacob Bekenstein suggests that black holes have an entropy proportional to their surface area due to information loss effects
- 1974 — Stephen Hawking applies quantum field theory to black hole spacetimes and shows that black holes will radiate particles with a black-body spectrum which can cause black hole evaporation
- 1975 — James Bardeen and Jacobus Petterson show that the swirl of spacetime around a spinning black hole can act as a gyroscope stabilizing the orientation of the accretion disc and jets
- 1989 — Identification of microquasar V404 Cygni as a binary black hole candidate system
- 1989 — Eric Poisson and Werner Israel theorize the concept of mass-inflation, a phenomenon in which the curvature and gravitational mass parameter inside a spinning or charged black hole grow to infinity as one approaches the inner horizon, causing an infalling observer to experience a singularity at the inner horizon of the black hole.
- 1994 — Charles Townes and colleagues observe ionized neon gas swirling around the center of our Galaxy at such high velocities that a possible black hole mass at the very center must be approximately equal to that of 3 million suns

== 21st century ==
- 2002 — Astronomers at the Max Planck Institute for Extraterrestrial Physics present evidence for the hypothesis that Sagittarius A* is a supermassive black hole at the center of the Milky Way galaxy.
- 2002 — Physicists at The Ohio State University publish fuzzball theory, which is a quantum description of black holes positing that they are extended objects composed of strings and don't have singularities.
- 2002 — NASA's Chandra X-ray Observatory identifies double galactic black holes system in merging galaxies NGC 6240.
- 2004 — Further observations by a team from UCLA present even stronger evidence supporting Sagittarius A* as a black hole.
- 2004 — One of the first VLBI observations of the black hole Sagittarius A* are made by a team that later becomes part of the Event Horizon Telescope collaboration
- 2012 — First visual evidence of black-holes: Suvi Gezari's team in Johns Hopkins University, using the Hawaiian telescope Pan-STARRS 1, publish images of a supermassive black hole 2.7 million light-years away swallowing a red giant
- 2015 — LIGO Scientific Collaboration detects the distinctive gravitational waveforms from a binary black hole merging into a final black hole, yielding the basic parameters (e.g., distance, mass, and spin) of the three spinning black holes involved.
- 2019 — Event Horizon Telescope collaboration releases the first direct photo of a black hole, the supermassive M87* at the core of the Messier 87 galaxy.
- 2022— Event Horizon Telescope releases the first image of the supermassive black hole Sagittarius A* at the centre of the milky way galaxy.

== See also ==
- Timeline of gravitational physics and relativity
- Schwarzschild radius
