= Blandford–Znajek process =

Explanation for how quasars are powered

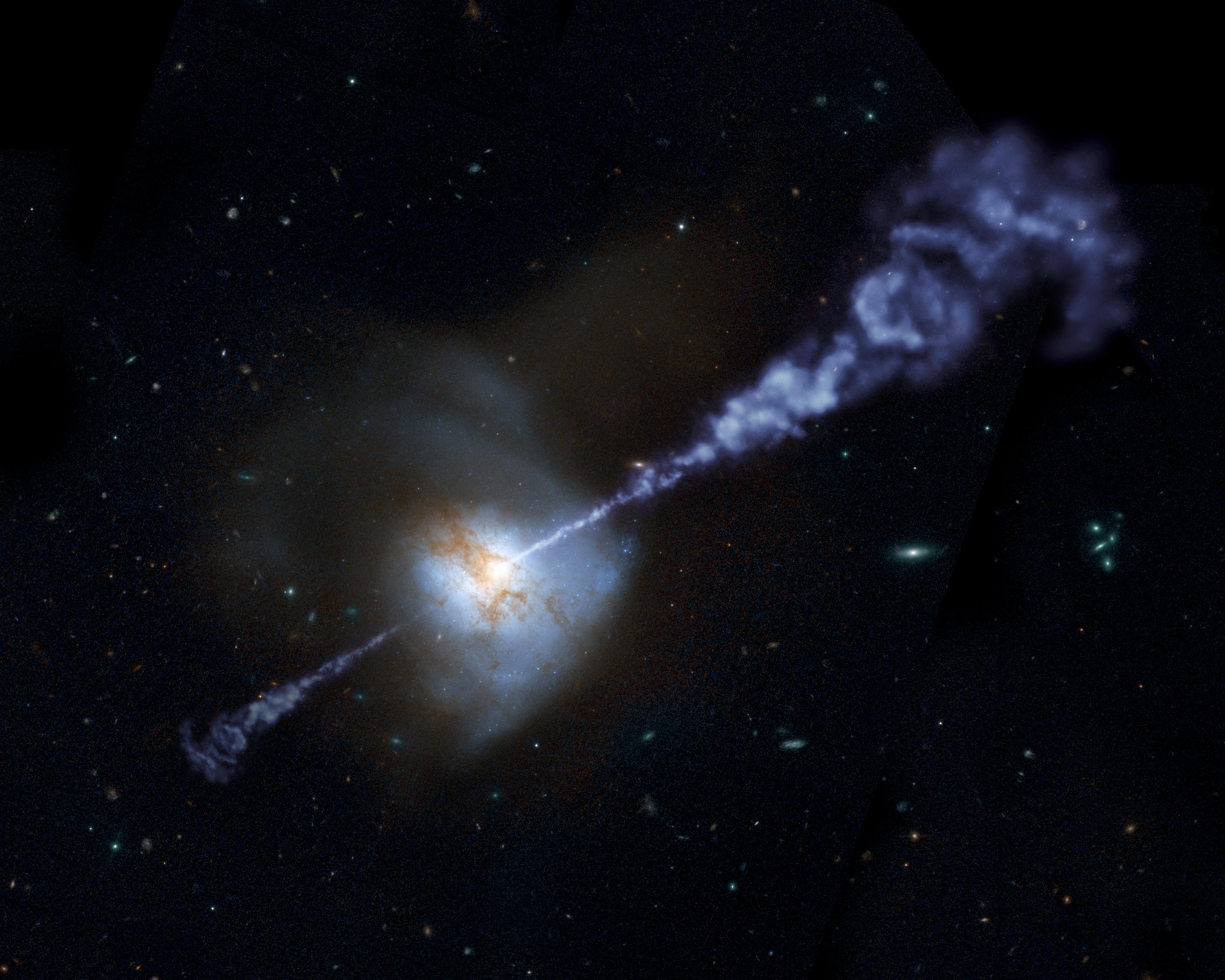
An artist's impression of an active galactic nucleus with relativistic jets.

The Blandford–Znajek process is a mechanism for the extraction of energy from a rotating black hole, introduced by Roger Blandford and Roman Znajek in 1977. This mechanism is the most preferred description of how astrophysical jets are formed around spinning supermassive black holes, giving rise to the large-scale structures seen in radio galaxies. Generally speaking, it was demonstrated that the power output of the accretion disk is significantly larger than the power output extracted directly from the hole, through its ergosphere. Hence, the presence (or not) of a poloidal magnetic field around the black hole is not determinant in its overall power output. It was also suggested that the mechanism plays a crucial role as a central engine for a gamma-ray burst.

== Physics of the mechanism ==
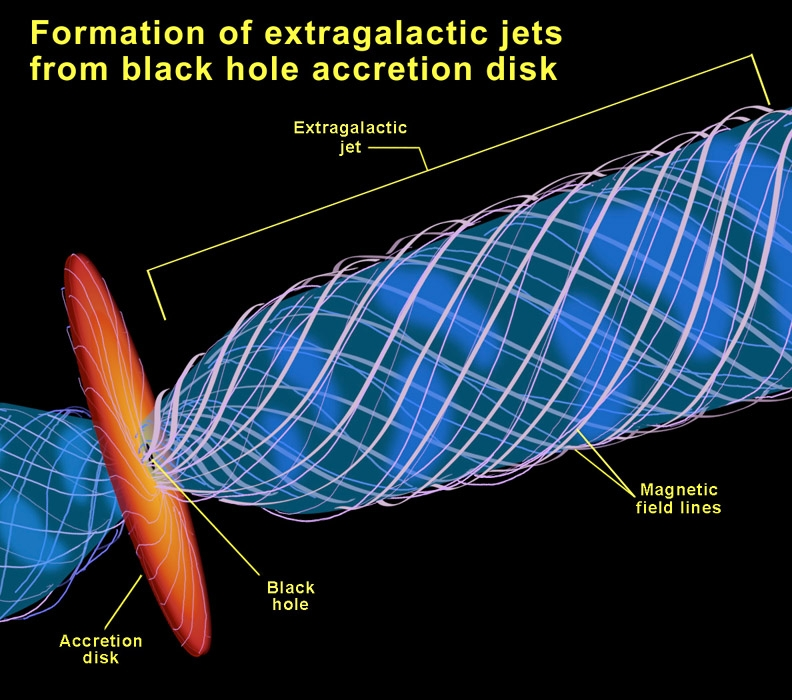
Magnetic field lines around the jets of a quasar.

As in the Penrose process, the ergosphere plays an important role in the Blandford–Znajek process. In order to extract energy and angular momentum from the black hole, the electromagnetic field around the hole must be modified by magnetospheric currents. In order to drive such currents, the electric field needs to not be screened, and consequently the vacuum field created within the ergosphere by distant sources must have an unscreened component. The most favored way to provide this is an e^{±} pair cascade in a strong electric and radiation field. As the ergosphere causes the magnetosphere inside it to rotate, the outgoing flux of angular momentum results in extraction of energy from the black hole.

The Blandford–Znajek process requires an accretion disc with a strong poloidal magnetic field around a spinning black hole. The magnetic field extracts spin energy, and the power can be estimated as the energy density at the speed of light cylinder times area:

$$P = B^2\left(\frac{r}{r_c}\right)^4 r_c c = \frac{B^2 r^4 \omega^2}{c},$$

where B is the magnetic field strength, $r_c$ is the Schwarzschild radius, and ω is the angular velocity.

== See also ==
- Penrose process, another mechanism to extract energy from a black hole
- Hawking radiation, another mechanism to extract mass, hence energy from a black hole
- Astrophysical jets, large structures seen around some quasars and created by the Blandford–Znajek process and/or the Penrose process
