= BHI =

BHI may refer to:

- Beverly Hills Internet, former name of GeoCities, a web hosting service
- BHI, station code for Birmingham International railway station, a United Kingdom railway station
- Black Hebrew Israelites, African Americans who claim that they are descendants of the ancient Israelites
- Black Hole Initiative, an interdisciplinary science program at Harvard University
- Bristol Heart Institute, research and medical clinic in Bristol, England
- British Horological Institute, the representative body of the horological industry in the United Kingdom
- Brain heart infusion broth, a growth medium for growing microorganisms
- Bundaran HI MRT station, a rapid transit station in Jakarta, Indonesia
- Bald Head Island, North Carolina, a village located in Brunswick County, North Carolina, United States
- BHI, former stock symbol of Baker Hughes, a General Electric (American) industrial service company
- BHI, inventory number code assigned to all specimen or sample included in the catalogue of the Black Hills Institute of Geological Research (for example, Tyrannosaurus rex specimen nicknamed "Stan" is identified with the inventory number "BHI 3033")
