= Black Hole Initiative =

Interdisciplinary science program at Harvard University

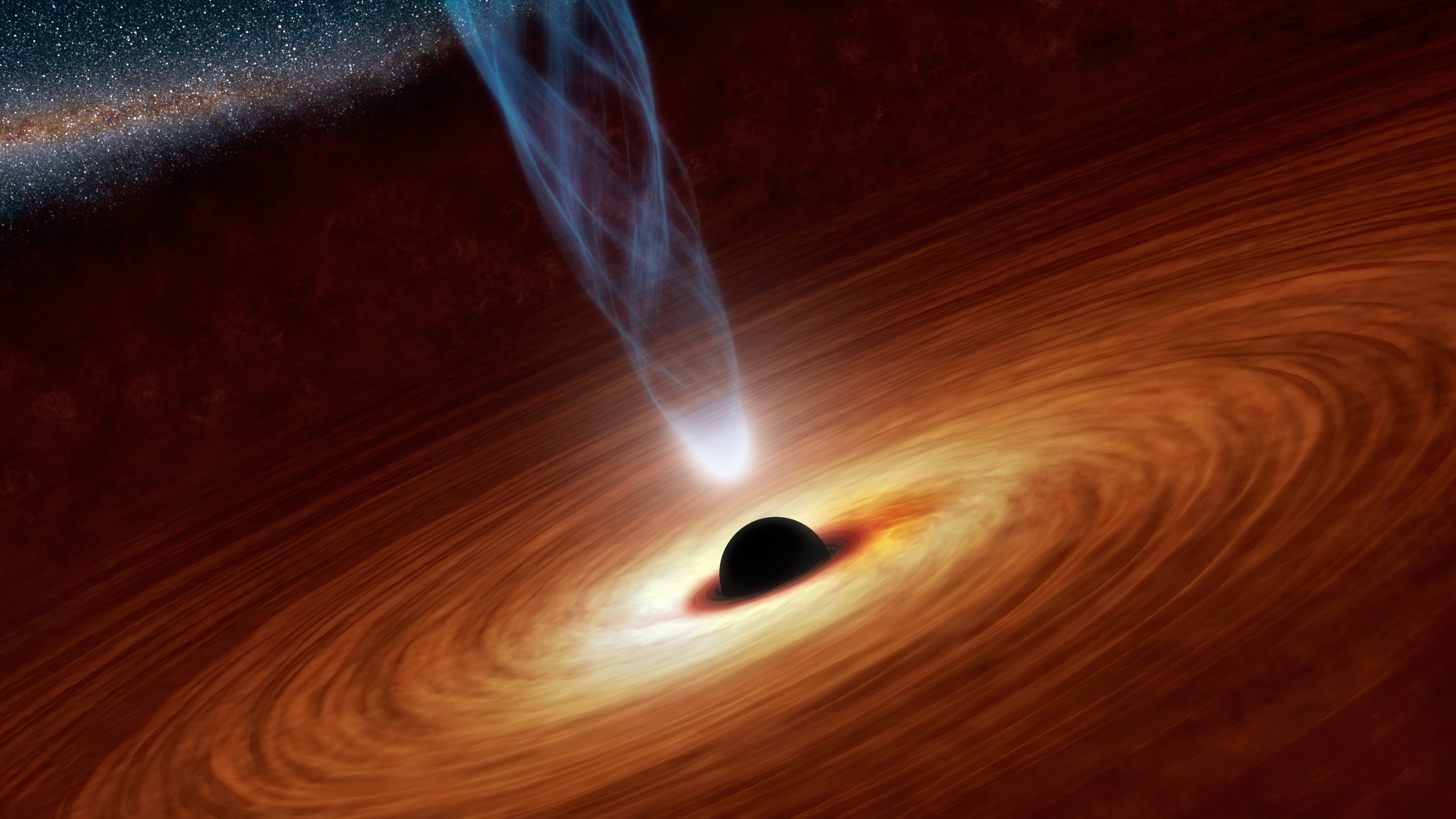
Black hole with corona and X-Ray source (artist concept)

The Black Hole Initiative (BHI) is an interdisciplinary center at Harvard University that includes the fields of astronomy, physics, and philosophy, and is claimed to be the first center in the world to focus on the study of black holes. Principal participants include Sheperd S. Doeleman, Peter Galison, Avi Loeb, Andrew Strominger and Shing-Tung Yau. The initiative also provides for the support of BHI Fellows, who receive financial support for three years while they carry out independent research related to black holes. The BHI inauguration was held on 18 April 2016 and attended by Stephen Hawking; related workshop events were held on 19 April 2016. Robbert Dijkgraaf created the mural for the BHI Inauguration.

The BHI is funded by the John Templeton Foundation and the Gordon and Betty Moore Foundation. Harvard University allocated office space for the BHI on the second floor of 20 Garden Street in Cambridge, Massachusetts. The BHI is an independent Center within the Faculty of Arts & Sciences at Harvard University.

If determinism — the predictability of the universe — breaks down in black holes, it could break down in other situations. Even worse, if determinism breaks down, we can’t be sure of our past history either. The history books and our memories could just be illusions. It is the past that tells us who we are. Without it, we lose our identity.

— Stephen Hawking, BHI Inauguration, Harvard University, 18 April 2016

== See also ==
- Cosmology
- Galactic Center
- Galaxy
- General relativity
- Black hole information paradox
- List of black holes
- Outline of black holes
- Timeline of black hole physics
