= Carter constant =

Constant of motion in the Kerr-Newman spacetime

The Carter constant is a conserved quantity for motion around black holes in the general relativistic formulation of gravity. Its SI base units are kg^{2}⋅m^{4}⋅s^{−2}. Carter's constant was derived for a spinning, charged black hole by Australian theoretical physicist Brandon Carter in 1968. Carter's constant along with the energy $p_{t}$, axial angular momentum $p_{\phi}$, and particle rest mass $\sqrt{|p_{\mu}p^{\mu}|}$ provide the four conserved quantities necessary to uniquely determine all orbits in the Kerr–Newman spacetime (even those of charged particles).

== Formulation ==
Carter noticed that the Hamiltonian for motion in Kerr spacetime was separable in Boyer–Lindquist coordinates, allowing the constants of such motion to be easily identified using Hamilton–Jacobi theory. The Carter constant can be written as follows:

$$C = p_{\theta}^{2} + \cos^{2}\theta \Bigg( a^{2}(m^{2} - E^{2}) + \left(\frac{L_z}{\sin\theta} \right)^{2} \Bigg)$$,

with the convention $G=c=1$ and where $p_{\theta}$ is the latitudinal component of the particle's angular momentum, $E=p_t$ is the conserved energy of the particle per unit mass, $L_z=p_{\phi}$ is the particle's conserved axial angular momentum per unit mass, $m=\sqrt{|p_{\mu}p^{\mu}|}$ is the rest mass of the particle, and $a$ is the spin parameter of the black hole which satisfies $0\leq a\leq M$. Note that here $p_{\mu}$ denotes the covariant components of the four-momentum in Boyer-Lindquist coordinates which may be calculated from the particle's position $X^{\mu}=(t,r,\theta,\phi)$ parameterized by the particle's proper time $\tau$ using its four-velocity $U^{\mu}=dX^{\mu}/d\tau$ as $p_{\mu}=g_{\mu\nu} p^{\nu}$ where $p^{\mu}=m U^{\mu}$ is the four-momentum and $g_{\mu\nu}$ is the Kerr metric. Thus, the conserved energy constant and angular momentum constant are not to be confused with the energy $U_{\rm obs}^{\mu}p_{\mu}$ measured by an observer and the angular momentum $\mathbf{L}=\boldsymbol{x}\wedge \boldsymbol{p} = r p_{\theta}\boldsymbol{dr}\wedge\boldsymbol{d \theta} + r p_{\phi}\boldsymbol{dr}\wedge\boldsymbol{d\phi} = m r g_{\theta\theta} \dot{\theta}\boldsymbol{dr}\wedge\boldsymbol{d \theta} + mr (g_{t\phi}\dot{t}+g_{\phi\phi}\dot\phi)\boldsymbol{dr}\wedge\boldsymbol{d\phi}$. The angular momentum component along $z$ is $L_{xy}$ which coincides with $p_\phi$.

Because functions of conserved quantities are also conserved, any function of $C$ and the three other constants of the motion can be used as a fourth constant in place of $C$. This results in some confusion as to the form of Carter's constant. For example, it is sometimes more convenient to use:

$$K = C + (L_z - a E)^{2}$$

in place of $C$. The quantity $K$ is useful because it is always non-negative. In general any fourth conserved quantity for motion in the Kerr family of spacetimes may be referred to as "Carter's constant". In the $a=0$ limit, $C=L^2-L_z^2$ and $K=L^2$, where $L$ is the norm of the angular momentum vector, see Schwarzschild limit below. Note that while $C=L_x^2 + L_y^2\geq 0$ and $K=L^2\geq 0$ in the Schwarzschild case, $C$ may be either positive or negative in the general case with $a>0$. For example, purely radially infalling or outgoing timelike geodesics have $L_z=p_\theta=0$ and a strictly negative $C$.

In explicit notation, the Carter constant is given by:

$$C=p_\theta^2+\cos^2\theta\Bigg(a^2\left(m^2c^2-\frac{E^2}{c^2}\right)+\left(\frac{L_z}{\sin\theta}\right)^2\Bigg)$$,

and $C>a^2\left(m^2c^2-\frac{E^2}{c^2}\right)$is a necessary condition to allow a motion along the colatitude $\theta$.

== As generated by a Killing tensor ==
Noether's theorem states that each conserved quantity of a system generates a continuous symmetry of that system. Carter's constant is related to a higher order symmetry of the Kerr metric generated by a second order Killing tensor field $\mathbf{K}$ (different $K$ than used above). In component form:

$$C = K^{\mu\nu}u_{\mu}u_{\nu}$$,

where $u$ is the four-velocity of the particle in motion. The components of the Killing tensor in Boyer–Lindquist coordinates are:

$$K^{\mu\nu}=2\Sigma\ l^{(\mu}n^{\nu)} + r^2 g^{\mu\nu}$$,

where $g^{\mu\nu}$ are the components of the metric tensor and $l^\mu$ and $n^\nu$ are the components of the principal null vectors:

$$l^\mu = \left(\frac{r^2 + a^2}{\Delta},1,0,\frac{a}{\Delta}\right)$$
$$n^\nu = \left(\frac{r^2 + a^2}{2\Sigma},-\frac{\Delta}{2\Sigma},0,\frac{a}{2\Sigma}\right)$$

with

$$\Sigma = r^2 + a^2 \cos^2 \theta \ , \ \ \Delta = r^2 - r_{s} \ r + a^2$$.

The parentheses in $l^{(\mu}n^{\nu)}$ are notation for symmetrization:

$$l^{(\mu}n^{\nu)} = \frac{1}{2}(l^{\mu}n^{\nu} + l^{\nu}n^{\mu})$$

== Asymptotics ==
Carter constant per unit mass squared may be expressed with the four-velocity as

$$\frac{C}{m^2} = g_{\theta\theta}\dot{\theta}^{2} + \cos^{2}\theta \Bigg( a^{2}(1 - (g_{tt} \dot{t} + g_{t\phi}\dot{\phi})^2) + \left(\frac{g_{\phi t} \dot{t} + g_{\phi\phi}\dot{\phi}}{\sin\theta} \right)^{2} \Bigg)$$

Asymptotically for large $r \gg M$, this tends to

$$\frac{C}{m^2} =
(r^2+a^2\cos^2\theta)^2\dot{\theta}^{2} +
a^{2}\cos^{2}\theta\left[1 - \left[\left(1-\frac{2M}{r}\right)\dot{t} + \frac{2Ma\sin^2\theta}{r} \dot{\phi}\right]^2\right]
+ \left[(r^2+a^2)\,\dot{\phi} - \frac{2Ma}{r} \dot{t}\right]^2\sin^2\theta\cos^{2}\theta$$
$$C = m^2\gamma^2 r^2 (v_\theta^2+v_\phi^2\cos^2\theta) - 4m^2Ma \gamma^2 \cos^2\theta\sin\theta\,v_\phi + m^2 \gamma^2 a^2 \cos^2\theta\, (v_\theta^2+v_\phi^2 - v_r^2)$$
$$\quad=L^2-L_z^2 - 4\gamma\frac{mM}{r}a \cos^2\theta\,L_z + m^2 \gamma^2 a^2 \cos^2\theta\, (v_\theta^2+v_\phi^2 - v_r^2)$$

where $U^\mu=dx^{\mu}/d\tau$, $v^i=dx^i/dt$, $v_{r}=dr/dt$, $v_{\theta}=r\,d\theta/dt$, $v_{\phi}=r\sin\theta\,d\phi/dt$, $\gamma=dt/d\tau=(1-v^2)^{-1/2}$, $v=(v_i v^i)^{1/2}$, $\mathbf{L}=\gamma m \mathbf{x} \times \mathbf{v}$, ${L}=\gamma m r \sqrt{v_\theta^2+v_{\phi}^2}$, $L_z=\gamma m r\sin \theta \,v_{\phi}$ valid asymptotically for $r\gg 2M$. Given that $C$ and $L_z$ are conserved this shows that $L^2$ is conserved only up to $a/r$ corrections. This is similar to the behavior of the angular momentum for a particle moving in the gravitational potential of an extended body of size $a$.

== Schwarzschild limit ==
The spherical symmetry of the Schwarzschild metric for non-spinning black holes allows one to reduce the problem of finding the trajectories of particles to three dimensions. In this case one only needs $E$, $L_z$, and $m$ to determine the motion; however, the symmetry leading to Carter's constant still exists. Carter's constant for Schwarzschild space is:

$$C = p_{\theta}^{2} + L_z^2 \cot^2\theta$$.

To see how this is related to the angular momentum two-form $L_{ij}=x_i \wedge p_j$ in spherical coordinates where $\boldsymbol{x}=r\boldsymbol{dr}$ and $\boldsymbol{p}=p_r\boldsymbol{dr}+p_\theta\boldsymbol{d\theta}+p_\phi\boldsymbol{d\phi}$, where $(p_{r}, p_{\theta}, p_{\phi}) = (g_{rr}p^{r}, g_{\theta\theta}p^{\theta}, g_{\phi\phi}p^{\phi}) = m( (1-2M/r)^{-1} \dot{r}, r^2 \dot{\theta}, r^2 \sin^2\theta\, \dot{\phi})$, and where $\dot\phi = d\phi/d\tau$ and similarly for $\dot\theta$, we have

$$\mathbf{L}=\boldsymbol{x}\wedge \boldsymbol{p} = r p_{\theta}\boldsymbol{dr}\wedge\boldsymbol{d \theta} + r p_{\phi}\boldsymbol{dr}\wedge\boldsymbol{d\phi}
= m r^3 \dot{\theta}\boldsymbol{dr}\wedge\boldsymbol{d \theta} + mr^3 \sin^2\theta\, \dot\phi\,\boldsymbol{dr}\wedge\boldsymbol{d\phi}$$.

Since $\boldsymbol{\hat{\theta}}=r\boldsymbol{d \theta}$ and $\boldsymbol{\hat{\phi}}=r\sin\theta\,\boldsymbol{d \phi}$ represent an orthonormal basis, the Hodge dual of $\mathbf{L}$ is the one form

$$\boldsymbol{L^*} = m r^2 \dot{\theta} \hat{\boldsymbol{\phi}} + m r^2 \sin\theta\, \dot{\phi}\, \hat{\boldsymbol{\theta}}$$

consistent with $\vec{\boldsymbol{r}}\times m\vec{\boldsymbol{v}}$ although here $\dot{\theta}$ and $\dot{\phi}$ are with respect to proper time. Its norm is

$$L^2 = g^{\theta\theta} r^2 p_{\theta}^2 + g^{\phi\phi} r^2 p_{\phi}^2
= g_{\theta\theta} r^2 (p^\theta)^2 + g_{\phi\phi} r^2 (p^\phi)^2
=  m^2 r^4 \dot{\theta}^2 + m^2 r^4 \sin^2\theta\, \dot\phi^2$$.

Further since $p_{\theta} = g_{\theta\theta}p^{\theta} = m r^2 \dot\theta$ and $L_z = p_{\phi} = g_{\phi\phi}p^{\phi} = m r^2 \sin^2\theta\, \dot\phi$, upon substitution we get

$$C = m^2r^4 \dot\theta^2 + m^2 r^4 \sin^2\theta \cos^2\theta \,\dot\phi^2 =  m^2r^4 \dot\theta^2 + m^2 r^4 \sin^2\theta\,\dot\phi^2 -m^2 r^4 \sin^4\theta\,\dot\phi^2 = L^2 - L_z^2$$.

In the Schwarzschild case, all components of the angular momentum vector are conserved, so both $L^2$ and $L_z^2$ are conserved, hence $C$ is clearly conserved. For Kerr, $L_z=p_{\phi}$ is conserved but $p_{\theta}$ and $L^2$ are not, nevertheless $C$ is conserved.

The other form of Carter's constant is the always non-negative conserved quantity

$$K = C + (L_z - a E)^{2} = (L^2 - L_z^2) + (L_z - a E)^{2}  = L^2$$

since here $a=0$. This is also clearly conserved. In the Schwarzschild case both $C\geq 0$ and $K\geq 0$, where $K= 0$ are radial orbits and $C=0$ with $K> 0$ corresponds to orbits confined to the equatorial plane of the coordinate system, i.e. $\theta=\pi/2$ for all times.

== See also ==
- Kerr metric
- Kerr–Newman metric
- Boyer–Lindquist coordinates
- Hamilton–Jacobi equation
- Euler's three-body problem
