= Black hole bomb =

Physical effect when superradiant modes are confined around a rotating black hole

A black hole bomb is the name given to a physical effect utilizing how a bosonic field impinging on a rotating black hole can be amplified through superradiant scattering. If the amplified field is reflected back towards the black hole, the amplification can be repeated, leading to a run-away growth of the field, i.e. an explosion. This explosion can be as powerful as a supernova. One way this reflection could be realized in nature is if the bosonic field has mass. The mass of the field can then cause the amplified modes to be trapped around the black hole, leading to an endless cycle of self-amplification. This is called a superradiant instability, as the amplified field can be generated out of noise, making the system inherently unstable. It can also refer to one such method of creating such a runaway effect, a Penrose sphere with no means for energy to passively escape.

== History ==
The idea that angular momentum and energy may be transferred from a rotating black hole to a particle being scattered by it was proposed by Roger Penrose in 1971 (Penrose process). In 1972 Yakov Zel'dovich realised this was true also for waves with angular momentum being scattered by any rotating absorber, giving the example of electromagnetic waves scattering from a metal cylinder, and noted that by surrounding the system by a resonant reflector, the amplification effect could turn into generation. The runaway effect in the astrophysical case was first explored by William H. Press and Saul Teukolsky in 1972, when they coined the phrase 'black hole bomb'. If such an effect were to spontaneously occur, it may point to new physics beyond the Standard Model, and showing that black holes have "hair", as pointed out by a paper from 2017, by William E. East and Frans Pretorius.

== Black hole bomb type instabilities ==
Other systems may show black hole bomb instabilities, for example electromagnetic and acoustic systems. In Zel'dovich's general rotational superradiance case, if the superradiant modes are confined around the absorber so they can re-amplify, and the loss from the system is lower than the amplification gain, the system becomes unstable. Noise generates an exponential increase in the amplitude of the superradiant modes, until the system either can no longer confine the mode energy (explodes), or the rotating body has lost sufficient energy to no longer meet the superradiance condition of the confined resonant modes. In 2025, the instability was reported in an electromagnetic experiment.

== See also ==
- Superradiance
- Penrose process
