= Ring singularity =

Gravitational singularity of a rotating black hole

A ring singularity or ringularity is the gravitational singularity of a rotating black hole, or a Kerr black hole, that is shaped like a ring.

== Description ==
Event horizons and ergospheres of a rotating black hole; the ringularity is located at the equatorial kink of the inner ergosphere at R=a.

When a spherical non-rotating body of a critical radius collapses under its own gravitation under general relativity, theory suggests it will collapse to a 0-dimensional single point. This is not the case with a rotating black hole (a Kerr black hole). With a fluid rotating body, its distribution of mass is not spherical (it shows an equatorial bulge), and it has angular momentum. Since a point cannot support rotation or angular momentum in classical physics (general relativity being a classical theory), the minimal shape of the singularity that can support these properties is instead a 2D ring with zero thickness but non-zero radius, and this is referred to as a ringularity or Kerr singularity.

A rotating hole's rotational frame-dragging effects, described by the Kerr metric, cause spacetime in the vicinity of the ring to undergo curvature in the direction of the ring's motion. Effectively this means that different observers placed around a Kerr black hole who are asked to point to the hole's apparent center of gravity may point to different points on the ring. Falling objects will begin to acquire angular momentum from the ring before they actually strike it, and the path taken by a perpendicular light ray (initially traveling toward the ring's center) will curve in the direction of ring motion before intersecting with the ring.

== Traversability and nakedness ==
An observer crossing the event horizon of a non-rotating and uncharged black hole (a Schwarzschild black hole) cannot avoid the central singularity, which lies in the future world line of everything within the horizon. Thus, one cannot avoid spaghettification by the tidal forces of the central singularity.

This is not necessarily true with a Kerr black hole. An observer falling into a Kerr black hole may be able to avoid the central singularity by making clever use of the inner event horizon associated with this class of black hole. This makes it theoretically (but not likely practically) possible for the Kerr black hole to act as a sort of wormhole, possibly even a traversable wormhole.

== As a toy wormhole ==
The Kerr singularity can also be used as a mathematical tool to study the wormhole "field line problem". If a particle is passed through a wormhole, the continuity equations for the electric field suggest that the field lines should not be broken. When an electrical charge passes through a wormhole, the particle's charge field lines appear to emanate from the entry mouth and the exit mouth gains a charge density deficit due to Bernoulli's principle. (For mass, the entry mouth gains mass density and the exit mouth gets a mass density deficit.) Since a Kerr singularity has the same feature, it also allows this issue to be studied.

== Existence ==
It is generally expected that since the usual collapse to a point singularity under general relativity involves arbitrarily dense conditions, quantum effects may become significant and prevent the singularity forming ("quantum fuzz"). Without quantum gravitational effects, there is good reason to suspect that the interior geometry of a rotating black hole is not the Kerr geometry. The inner Cauchy horizon of the Kerr geometry is probably not stable, due to the infinite blue-shifting of infalling radiation. This observation was supported by the investigation of charged black holes which exhibited similar "infinite blueshifting" behavior. While much work has been done, the realistic gravitational collapse of objects into rotating black holes, and the resultant geometry, continues to be an active research topic.

== See also ==
- Black hole
- Black hole electron
- Gravitational singularity
- Geon (physics)
