= Photon sphere =

Region around a black hole at which light orbits

An animation of how light rays can be gravitationally bent to form a photon sphere

A photon sphere, or photon ring or photon circle, arises in a neighbourhood of the event horizon of a black hole where gravity is so strong that emitted photons will not just bend around the black hole but also return to the point where they were emitted from and consequently display boomerang-like properties. As the source emitting photons falls into the gravitational field towards the event horizon the shape of the trajectory of each boomerang photon changes, tending to a more circular form. At a critical value of the radial distance from the singularity the trajectory of a boomerang photon will take the form of an unstable circular orbit, thus forming a photon circle and hence in aggregation a photon sphere. The circular photon orbit is said to be the last photon orbit. The radius of the photon sphere, which is also the lower bound for any circular orbit, is, for a Schwarzschild black hole,

$$r = \frac{3GM}{c^2} = \frac{3r_\text{s}}{2},$$

where G is the gravitational constant, M is the mass of the black hole, c is the speed of light in vacuum, and r_{s} is the Schwarzschild radius (the radius of the event horizon); see below for a derivation of this result.

This equation entails that photon spheres can only exist in the space surrounding an extremely compact object (a black hole or possibly an "ultracompact" neutron star).

The photon sphere is located farther from the center of a black hole than the event horizon. Within a photon sphere, it is possible to imagine a photon that is emitted (or reflected) from the back of one's head and, following an orbit of the black hole, is then intercepted by the person's eye, allowing one to see the back of the head (however very distorted), see e.g.

For non-rotating black holes, the photon sphere is a sphere of radius 3/2 r_{s}. There are no stable free-fall orbits that exist within or cross the photon sphere. Any free-fall orbit that crosses it from the outside spirals into the black hole. Any orbit that crosses it from the inside escapes to infinity or falls back in and spirals into the black hole. No unaccelerated orbit with a semi-major axis less than this distance is possible, but within the photon sphere, a constant acceleration will allow a spacecraft or probe to hover above the event horizon.

Another property of the photon sphere is centrifugal force (not centripetal) reversal. Outside the photon sphere, the faster one orbits, the greater the outward force one feels. Centrifugal force falls to zero at the photon sphere, including non-freefall orbits at any speed, i.e. an object weighs the same no matter how fast it orbits, and becomes negative inside it. Inside the photon sphere, faster orbiting leads to greater weight or inward force. This has serious ramifications for the fluid dynamics of inward fluid flow.

A rotating black hole has many photon "spheres", more precisely oblates (spheroids more or less flattened at the poles, depending on photon approach direction). As a black hole rotates, it drags space with it. In a polar orbit, there is only one photon sphere. This is because when approaching from a direction parallel to the rotation axis, the possibility of traveling with or against the rotation does not exist. The rotation will instead cause the orbit to precess. The other photon spheres that are closer to the black hole than the polar orbit sphere have the same spin as the black hole, and those farther away have the opposite spin. The greater the angular velocity of the rotation of a black hole, the greater the distance between the nearest and farthest photon spheres. If the photons are approaching the black hole in the direction of the equator, the photon spheres degenerate into circles in the equatorial plane.

== Derivation for a Schwarzschild black hole ==
Since a Schwarzschild black hole has spherical symmetry, all possible axes for a circular photon orbit are equivalent, and all circular orbits have the same radius.

This derivation involves using the Schwarzschild metric, given by

$$ds^2 = \left(1 - \frac{r_\text{s}}{r}\right) c^2 \,dt^2 - \left(1 - \frac{r_\text{s}}{r}\right)^{-1} \,dr^2 - r^2 (\sin^2\theta \,d\phi^2 + d\theta^2).$$

For a photon traveling at a constant radius r (i.e. in the φ-coordinate direction), $dr = 0$. Since it is a photon, $ds = 0$ (a "light-like interval"). We can always rotate the coordinate system such that $\theta$ is constant, $d\theta = 0$ (e.g., $\theta = \pi/2$).

Setting ds, dr and dθ to zero, we have

$$\left(1 - \frac{r_\text{s}}{r}\right) c^2 \,dt^2 = r^2 \sin^2\theta \,d\phi^2.$$

Re-arranging gives

$$\frac{d\phi}{dt} = \frac{c}{r \sin\theta} \sqrt{1 - \frac{r_\text{s}}{r}}.$$

To proceed, we need the relation $\frac{d\phi}{dt}$. To find it, we use the radial geodesic equation

$$\frac{d^2r}{d\tau^2} + \Gamma^r_{\mu\nu} u^\mu u^\nu = 0.$$

Non vanishing $\Gamma$-connection coefficients are

$$\Gamma^r_{tt} = \frac{c^2 BB'}{2}, \quad
\Gamma^r_{rr} = -\frac{B^{-1} B'}{2}, \quad
\Gamma^r_{\theta\theta} = -rB, \quad
\Gamma^r_{\phi\phi} = -Br\sin^2\theta,$$

where $B' = \frac{dB}{dr},\ B = 1 - \frac{r_\text{s}}{r}$.

We treat photon radial geodesics with constant r and $\theta$, therefore

$$\frac{dr}{d\tau} = \frac{d^2r}{d\tau^2} = \frac{d\theta}{d\tau} = 0.$$

Substituting it all into the radial geodesic equation (the geodesic equation with the radial coordinate as the dependent variable), we obtain

$$\left(\frac{d\phi}{dt}\right)^2 = \frac{c^2 r_\text{s}}{2r^3\sin^2\theta}.$$

Comparing it with what was obtained previously, we have

$$c \sqrt{\frac{r_\text{s}}{2r}} = c \sqrt{1 - \frac{r_\text{s}}{r}},$$

where we have inserted $\theta = \pi/2$ radians (imagine that the central mass, about which the photon is orbiting, is located at the centre of the coordinate axes. Then, as the photon is travelling along the $\phi$-coordinate line, for the mass to be located directly in the centre of the photon's orbit, we must have $\theta = \pi/2$ radians).

Hence, rearranging this final expression gives

$$r = \frac{3}{2} r_\text{s},$$

which is the result we set out to prove.

== Photon orbits around a Kerr black hole ==
Views from the side (l) and from above a pole (r). A rotating black hole has 2 radii between which light can orbit on a constant r coordinate outside of the horizon. In this animation, all photon orbits for a = m are shown.

In contrast to a Schwarzschild black hole, a Kerr (spinning) black hole does not have spherical symmetry, but only an axis of symmetry, which has profound consequences for the photon orbits, see e.g. Cramer for details and simulations of photon orbits and photon circles. There are three circular photon orbits in the equatorial plane, with different Boyer–Lindquist radii:

$r_1 = 2r_s \left[\sin^2\left(\frac13 \arcsin\frac{|a|}{m}\right)\right]$(unstable prograde orbit),
$r_2 = r_s \left[1 + \cos\left(\frac23 \arccos\frac{-|a|}{m}\right)\right]$ (unstable prograde orbit),
$r_3 = r_s \left[1 + \cos\left(\frac23 \arccos\frac{|a|}{m}\right)\right]$ (unstable retrograde orbit),

with $0<r_1\le{m}\le r_2\le 3{m}\le r_3\le 4{m},$

where $m=\frac{GM}{c^2} = \frac{r_s}{2}$ and $a=\frac{J}{cM}$ with $J$ the spin angular momentum of the black hole and $|a|\le m$.

Note: $r_2$ and $r_3$ correspond respectively to the (degenerate) spheres of shortest radius $\ge {m}$ and greatest radius. The greater the black hole spin, the greater the gap between $r_2$ and $r_3$. $r_1$ is inside of the inner horizon when $|a|<m$ and coincides with both horizons when $|a|=m$ (extreme Kerr black hole).

There is one polar photon orbit (crossing through the two poles and dragged with the spin of the black hole) with Boyer-Lindquist radius:

$r_p = r_s \left[\frac{1}{2} + \sqrt{1 - \frac{a^2}{3m^2}} \cos\left(\frac{1}{3} \arccos\frac{1-\frac{a^2}{m^2}}{\left(1-\frac{a^2}{3m^2}\right)^{3/2}}\right)\right]$ (unstable orbit),

with $(1+\sqrt{2}){m}\le r_p\le 3{m}$.

This orbit is the limit between prograde and retrograde orbits.

When the radius of an orbit is less than $r_{stab}=m\left(1-\left(1-a^2/m^2\right)^{1/3}\right)$, the orbit is stable under radial perturbation, otherwise it is unstable.

When $a=0$ (Schwarzschild black hole), the above formulas lead to the only orbit $r_2=r_3=r_p=\frac{3}{2}r_s$ as seen in the previous section, and $r_{stab}=0$.

When $a\ne 0$, there exist other constant-radius orbits, but they have more complicated paths which oscillate in latitude about the equator, and except $|a|=m$ (extreme Kerr black hole), their radii have no simple analytical definition known to date.

In a negative-$r$ universe sheet, photons can follow constant-radius orbits known as “vortical”, which have a polar motion restricted to one side of the equatorial plane. These orbits are unstable under radial perturbation.

Unlike a Schwarzschild black hole, a photon sphere around a Kerr black hole can be generated by the orbit of a single photon.

== Observations ==
The first attempt to detect a photon ring was reported in August 2022 by Avery Broderick and colleagues, a subset of the Event Horizon Telescope (EHT) team. They used an alternative imaging algorithm on the EHT 2017 data of the supermassive black hole at the center of Messier 87 to isolate and extract an image they claimed to be a photon ring around the supermassive black hole M87*. The claim was criticized because the purported photon ring was brighter than expected; and a similar independent analysis of the EHT 2017 data, with limits on the purported photon ring's brightness, yielded no evidence for a photon ring detection.
