= Brandon Carter =

Australian physicist (born 1942)

Brandon Carter FRS
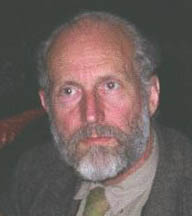
- Born: 1942 (age 83–84); Australia
- Education: University of Cambridge
- Known for: Anthropic principle Carter constant No-hair theorem Carter–Penrose diagrams Doomsday argument
- Scientific career
- Fields: General relativity
- Workplaces: CNRS
- Doctoral advisor: Dennis Sciama
- Doctoral students: Douglas N. C. Lin

Brandon Carter, FRS (born 1942) is an Australian theoretical physicist who explores the properties of black holes, and was the first to name and employ the anthropic principle in its contemporary form. He is a researcher at the Meudon campus of the Laboratoire Univers et Théories, part of the French CNRS.

== Biography ==
Carter studied at the University of Cambridge under Dennis Sciama. He found the exact solution of the geodesic equations for the Kerr/Newman electrovacuum solution, and the maximal analytic extension of this solution. In the process, he discovered the extraordinary fourth constant of motion and the Killing–Yano tensor. Together with Werner Israel and Stephen Hawking, he partially proved the no-hair theorem in general relativity, stating that all stationary black holes are completely characterized by mass, charge, and angular momentum. In 1982 with astrophysicist Jean-Pierre Luminet, he invented the concept of tidal disruption event (TDE), namely the destruction of a star passing in the vicinity of a supermassive black hole. They showed that this phenomenon could result in the violent destruction of the star in the form of a "stellar pancake", causing a reactivation of nuclear reactions in the core of the star in the stage of its maximum compression.

More recently, Carter, Chachoua, and Chamel (2005) have formulated a relativistic theory of elastic deformations in neutron stars.
