= Boyer–Lindquist coordinates =

Coordinate system for the Kerr metric

A Kerr black hole at various spin parameters in Kerr-Schwarzschild and Boyer-Lindquist coordinates.

In the mathematical description of general relativity, the Boyer–Lindquist coordinates are a generalization of the coordinates used for the metric of a Schwarzschild black hole that can be used to express the metric of a Kerr black hole.

The Hamiltonian for particle motion in Kerr spacetime is separable in Boyer–Lindquist coordinates. Using Hamilton–Jacobi theory one can derive a fourth constant of the motion known as Carter's constant.

The 1967 paper introducing Boyer–Lindquist coordinates by Richard W. Lindquist was also a posthumous publication for Dr. Robert Hamilton Boyer, who was killed in the 1966 University of Texas tower shooting at age 33.

== Line element ==
The line element for a black hole with a total mass equivalent $M$, angular momentum $J$, and charge $Q$ in Boyer–Lindquist coordinates and geometrized units ($G=c=1$) is

$$ds^2 = -\frac{\Delta}{\rho^2}\left(dt - a \sin^2\theta \,d\phi \right)^2 +\frac{\sin^2\theta}{\rho^2}\Big(\left(r^2+a^2\right)\,d\phi - a \,dt\Big)^2 + \frac{\rho^2}{\Delta}dr^2 + \rho^2 \,d\theta^2$$

or equivalently

$$ds^2 = -\left(1-\frac{2Mr-Q^2}{\rho^2}\right)dt^2 + \frac{\rho^2}{\Delta}dr^2 + \rho^2 d\theta^2 + \left[r^2 + a^2 + \frac{\left(2Mr-Q^2\right) a^2 \sin^2\theta}{\rho^2}\right]\sin^2\theta \,d\phi^2 - \frac{2\left(2Mr - Q^2\right)a \sin^2\theta}{\rho^2} \,d\phi dt$$

where

$\Delta = r^2 - 2Mr + a^2 + Q^2,$ called the discriminant,
$$\rho^2 = r^2 + a^2 \cos^2\theta,$$

and

$a = \frac{J}{M},$ called the Kerr parameter.

Note that in geometrized units $M$, $a$, and $Q$ all have units of length. This line element describes the Kerr–Newman metric. Here, $M$ is to be interpreted as the mass of the black hole, as seen by an observer at infinity, $J$ is interpreted as the angular momentum, and $Q$ the electric charge. These are all meant to be constant parameters, held fixed. The name of the discriminant arises because it appears as the discriminant of the quadratic equation bounding the time-like motion of particles orbiting the black hole, i.e. defining the ergosphere.

The coordinate transformation from Boyer–Lindquist coordinates $r$, $\theta$, $\phi$ to Cartesian coordinates $x$, $y$, $z$ is given (for $M\to 0$) by:
$$\begin{align}
x &= \sqrt {r^2 + a^2} \sin\theta\cos\phi \\
y &= \sqrt {r^2 + a^2} \sin\theta\sin\phi \\
z &= r \cos\theta
\end{align}$$

== Vierbein ==
The vierbein one-forms can be read off directly from the line element:

$$\sigma^0 = \frac{\sqrt{\varepsilon\Delta}}{\rho}\left(dt - a \sin^2\theta \,d\phi \right)$$
$$\sigma^1 = \frac{\rho}{\sqrt{\varepsilon\Delta}}dr$$
$$\sigma^2 = \rho \,d\theta$$
$$\sigma^3 = \frac{\sin\theta}{\rho}\Big(\left(r^2+a^2\right)\,d\phi - a \,dt\Big)$$

where $\varepsilon = \mathrm{sgn}(\Delta)$ which is $1$ outside the outer horizon, $-1$ between the inner and outer horizons, and $1$ inside the inner horizon. The line element is given by

$$ds^2=-\varepsilon (\sigma^0)^2 + \varepsilon (\sigma^1)^2 + (\sigma^2)^2 + (\sigma^3)^2.$$

In the region outside the outer horizon,

$$ds^2=\sigma^a\otimes\sigma^b \eta_{ab}$$

where $\eta_{ab}$ is the flat-space Minkowski metric.

== Spin connection ==
The torsion-free spin connection $\omega^{ab}$ is defined by

$$d\sigma^a + \omega^{ab} \wedge \sigma^c \eta_{bc}=0$$

The contorsion tensor gives the difference between a connection with torsion, and a corresponding connection without torsion. By convention, Riemann manifolds are always specified with torsion-free geometries; torsion is often used to specify equivalent, flat geometries.

The spin connection is useful because it provides an intermediate way-point for computing the curvature two-form:

$$R^{ab}=d\omega^{ab}+\omega^{ac}\wedge\omega^{db}\eta_{cd}$$

It is also the most suitable form for describing the coupling to spinor fields, and opens the door to the twistor formalism.

All six components of the spin connection are non-vanishing. These are:

$$\omega^{01}=\frac{1}{\rho^3}
\left[\frac{-2Mr^2+2rQ^2+a^2[M+r+(M-r)\cos 2\theta]}{2\sqrt{\Delta}}\,\sigma^0
+ra\sin\theta\,\sigma^3\right]$$

$$\omega^{02}=\frac{a\cos\theta}{\rho^3}
\left[a\sin\theta\,\sigma^0+\sqrt{\Delta}\,\sigma^3\right]$$

$$\omega^{03}=\frac{a}{\rho^3}
\left[r\sin\theta\,\sigma^1-\sqrt{\Delta}\cos\theta\,\sigma^2\right]$$

$$\omega^{12}=\frac{1}{\rho^3}
\left[a^2\sin\theta\cos\theta\,\sigma^1+r\sqrt{\Delta}\,\sigma^2\right]$$

$$\omega^{13}=\frac{r}{\rho^3}
\left[a\sin\theta\,\sigma^0+\sqrt{\Delta}\,\sigma^3\right]$$

$$\omega^{23}=\frac{\cot\theta}{\rho^3}
\left[a\sqrt{\Delta}\sin\theta\,\sigma^0+(r^2+a^2)\,\sigma^3\right]$$

== Riemann and Ricci tensors ==
The Riemann tensor written out in full is quite verbose; it can be found in Frè. The Ricci tensor takes the diagonal form:

$$\mbox{Ric}=\frac{Q^2}{\rho^4}
\begin{bmatrix}
1 & 0 & 0 & 0\\
0 & -1 & 0 & 0 \\
0 & 0 & 1 & 0 \\
0 & 0 & 0 & 1 \\
\end{bmatrix}$$

Notice the location of the minus-one entry: this comes entirely from the electromagnetic contribution. Namely, when the electromagnetic stress tensor $F_{ab}$ has only two non-vanishing components: $F_{01}$ and $F_{23}$, then the corresponding energy–momentum tensor takes the form

$$T^\mbox{Maxwell}=\frac{F_{01}^2+F_{23}^2}{4}
\begin{bmatrix}
1 & 0 & 0 & 0\\
0 & -1 & 0 & 0 \\
0 & 0 & 1 & 0 \\
0 & 0 & 0 & 1 \\
\end{bmatrix}$$

Equating this with the energy–momentum tensor for the gravitational field leads to the Kerr–Newman electrovacuum solution.
