= Ergosphere =

Region outside of a rotating black hole's event horizon

At the ergospheres (shown here in violet for the outer and red for the inner one), the temporal metric coefficient g_{tt} becomes negative, i.e., acts like a purely spatial metric component. Consequently, timelike or lightlike worldlines within this region must co-rotate with the inner mass. Cartesian projection, equatorial perspective.

In astrophysics, the ergosphere is a region located just outside a rotating black hole, between its event horizon and a further external surface predicted by the Kerr metric which describes these objects. Its name was proposed by Remo Ruffini and John Archibald Wheeler during the Les Houches lectures in 1971 and is derived from Ancient Greek ἔργον (ergon) 'work'. It received this name because it is theoretically possible to extract energy and mass from this region. The ergosphere touches the event horizon at the poles of a rotating black hole and extends to a greater radius at the equator. A black hole with modest angular momentum has an ergosphere with a shape approximated by an oblate spheroid, while faster spins produce a more pumpkin-shaped ergosphere. The equatorial (maximal) radius of an ergosphere is the Schwarzschild radius, the radius of a non-rotating black hole. The polar (minimal) radius is also the polar (minimal) radius of the event horizon which can be as little as half the Schwarzschild radius for a maximally rotating black hole.

== Rotation ==
As a black hole rotates, it twists spacetime in the direction of the rotation at a speed that decreases with distance from the event horizon. This process is known as the Lense–Thirring effect or frame-dragging. Because of this dragging effect, an object within the ergosphere cannot appear stationary with respect to an outside observer at a great distance unless that object were to move at faster than the speed of light (an impossibility) with respect to the local spacetime. The speed necessary for such an object to appear stationary decreases at points further out from the event horizon, until at some distance the required speed is negligible.

The set of all such points defines the ergosphere surface, called ergosurface. The outer surface of the ergosphere is called the static surface or static limit. This is because world lines change from being time-like outside the static limit to being space-like inside it. It is the speed of light that arbitrarily defines the ergosphere surface. Such a surface would appear as an oblate that is coincident with the event horizon at the pole of rotation, but at a greater distance from the event horizon at the equator. Outside this surface, space is still dragged, but at a lesser rate.

== Radial pull ==
Animation: A test particle approaching the ergosphere in the retrograde direction is forced to change its direction of motion (in Boyer–Lindquist coordinates).

A suspended plumb, held stationary outside the ergosphere, will experience an infinite/diverging radial pull as it approaches the static limit. At some point it will start to fall, resulting in a gravitomagnetically induced spinward motion. An implication of this dragging of space is the existence of negative energies within the ergosphere.

Since the ergosphere is outside the event horizon, it is still possible for objects that enter that region with sufficient velocity to escape from the gravitational pull of the black hole. An object can gain energy by entering the black hole's rotation and then escaping from it, thus taking some of the black hole's energy with it (making the maneuver similar to the exploitation of the Oberth effect around "normal" space objects).

This process of removing energy from a rotating black hole was proposed by the mathematician Roger Penrose in 1969 and is called the Penrose process. The maximal amount of energy gain possible for a single particle via this process is 20.7% in terms of its mass equivalence, and if this process is repeated by the same mass, the theoretical maximal energy gain approaches 29% of its original mass energy equivalent. As this energy is removed, the black hole loses angular momentum, and thus the limit of zero rotation is approached as spacetime dragging is reduced. In the limit, the ergosphere no longer exists. This process is considered a possible explanation for a source of energy of such energetic phenomena as gamma-ray bursts. Results from computer models show that the Penrose process is capable of producing the high-energy particles that are observed being emitted from quasars and other active galactic nuclei.

== Ergosphere size ==
The size of the ergosphere, the distance between the ergosurface and the event horizon, is not necessarily proportional to the radius of the event horizon, but rather to the black hole's gravity and its angular momentum. A point at the poles does not move, and thus has no angular momentum, while at the equator a point would have its greatest angular momentum. This variation of angular momentum that extends from the poles to the equator is what gives the ergosphere its oblate shape. As the mass of the black hole or its rotation speed increases, the size of the ergosphere increases as well.
