= Rotating black hole =

Black hole which possesses angular momentum

A rotating black hole is a black hole that possesses angular momentum. All currently known celestial objects, including planets, stars (including the Sun), galaxies, and black holes, spin about one of their axes.

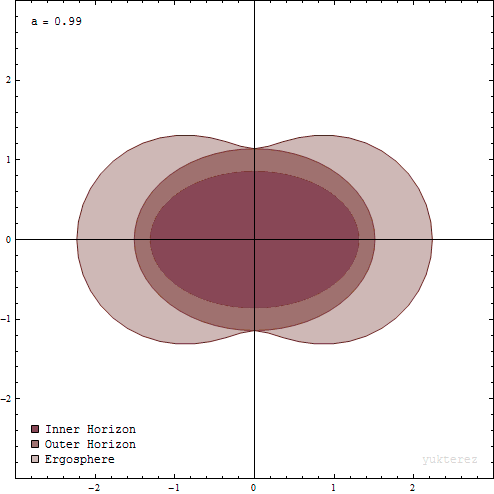
The boundaries of a Kerr black hole relevant to astrophysics. Note that there are no physical "surfaces" as such. The boundaries are mathematical surfaces, or sets of points in spacetime, relevant to analysis of the black hole's properties and interactions.

== Types of black holes ==
There are four known, exact, black hole solutions to the Einstein field equations, which describe gravity in general relativity. Two of those rotate: the Kerr and Kerr–Newman black holes. It is generally believed that every black hole decays rapidly to a stable black hole; and, by the no-hair theorem, that (except for quantum fluctuations) stable black holes can be completely described at any moment in time by these 11 numbers:

- mass–energy M,
- linear momentum P (three components),
- angular momentum J (three components),
- position X (three components),
- electric charge Q.

While from an infalling observer's perspective the plunge into a rotating black hole occurs in a finite proper time and with very high rapidity (left), from the perspective of a coordinate observer at infinity they slow down, approaching zero velocity at the horizon relative to a stationary probe on site while being whirled around forever by the black hole's frame-dragging effect (right).

Prograde bound orbit around a black hole rotating with a spin parameter of a/M = 0.9.

These numbers represent the conserved attributes of an object which can be determined from a distance by examining its electromagnetic and gravitational fields. All other variations in the black hole will either escape to infinity or be swallowed up by the black hole. This is because anything happening inside the black hole's event horizon cannot affect events outside of it.

In terms of these properties, the four types of black holes can be defined as follows:

Types of black holes, by rotation and charge properties
	Non-rotating (J = 0)	Rotating (J > 0)
Uncharged (Q = 0)	Schwarzschild	Kerr
Charged (Q ≠ 0)	Reissner–Nordström	Kerr–Newman

Note that astrophysical black holes are expected to have non-zero angular momentum, due to their formation via collapse of rotating stellar objects, but effectively zero charge, since any net charge will quickly attract the opposite charge and neutralize. For this reason the term "astrophysical" black hole is usually reserved for the Kerr black hole.

== Formation ==
Rotating black holes are formed in the gravitational collapse of a massive spinning star or from the collapse or collision of a collection of compact objects, stars, or gas with a total non-zero angular momentum. As all known stars rotate and realistic collisions have non-zero angular momentum, it is expected that all black holes in nature are rotating black holes. Since observed astronomical objects do not possess an appreciable net electric charge, only the Kerr solution has astrophysical relevance.

In late 2006, astronomers reported estimates of the spin rates of black holes in The Astrophysical Journal. A black hole in the Milky Way, GRS 1915+105, may rotate 1,150 times per second, approaching the theoretical upper limit.

=== Relation with gamma ray bursts ===
The formation of a rotating black hole by a collapsar is thought to be observed as the emission of gamma ray bursts.

== Conversion to a Schwarzschild black hole ==
A rotating black hole can produce large amounts of energy at the expense of its rotational energy. This can happen through the Penrose process inside the black hole's ergosphere, in the volume outside its event horizon. In some cases of energy extraction, a rotating black hole may gradually reduce to a Schwarzschild black hole, the minimum configuration from which no further energy can be extracted, although the Kerr black hole's rotation velocity will never quite reach zero.

== Kerr metric, Kerr–Newman metric ==
Rotating black hole from the perspective of the distant observer. The different frames show the black hole from different angles.

A rotating black hole is a solution of Einstein's field equation. There are two known exact solutions, the Kerr metric and the Kerr–Newman metric, which are believed to be representative of all rotating black hole solutions, in the exterior region.

In the vicinity of a black hole, space curves so much that light rays are deflected, and very nearby light can be deflected so much that it travels several times around the black hole. Hence, when we observe a distant background galaxy (or some other celestial body), we may be lucky to see the same image of the galaxy multiple times, albeit more and more distorted. A complete mathematical description for how light bends around the equatorial plane of a Kerr black hole was published in 2021.

In 2022, it was mathematically demonstrated that the equilibrium found by Roy Kerr in 1963 was stable and thus black holes—which were the solution to Einstein's equation of 1915—were stable.

== State transition ==
Rotating black holes have two temperature states they can exist in: heating (losing energy) and cooling.

== In popular culture ==
Kerr black holes are key to the "Swan Song" project by Joe Davis. They are also a key element in the 2014 film Interstellar.

== See also ==
- Black hole bomb
- Black hole spin parameter
- Black hole spin-flip
- BKL singularity – solution representing interior geometry of black holes formed by gravitational collapse.
- Ergosphere
- Kerr black holes as wormholes
- Penrose process
- Ring singularity
- Stellar black holes
