= Penrose process =

Hypothetical mechanism for extracting energy from rotating black holes

The Penrose process (also called Penrose mechanism) is theorised by Sir Roger Penrose as a means whereby energy can be extracted from a rotating black hole. The process takes advantage of the ergosphere – a region of spacetime around the black hole dragged by its rotation faster than the speed of light, meaning that from the point of view of an outside observer any matter inside is forced to move in the direction of the rotation of the black hole.

Trajectories of bodies in a Penrose process

In the process, a working body falls (black thick line in the figure) into the ergosphere (gray region). At its lowest point (red dot) the body fires a propellant backwards; however, to a faraway observer both seem to continue to move forward due to frame-dragging (albeit at different speeds). The propellant, being slowed, falls (thin gray line) to the event horizon of the black hole (black disk). The remains of the body, being sped up, fly away (thin black line) with an excess of energy (that more than offsets the loss of the propellant and the energy used to shoot it).

The maximum amount of energy gain possible for a single particle decay via the original (or classical) Penrose process is 20.7% of its mass in the case of an uncharged black hole (assuming the best case of maximal rotation of the black hole). The energy is taken from the rotation of the black hole, so there is a limit on how much energy one can extract by Penrose process and similar strategies (for an uncharged black hole no more than 29% of its original mass; larger efficiencies would be possible for charged rotating black holes).

== Details of the ergosphere ==
The outer surface of the ergosphere is the surface at which light that moves in the direction opposite to the rotation of the black hole remains at a fixed angular coordinate, according to an external observer. Since massive particles necessarily travel slower than light, massive particles will necessarily move along with the black hole's rotation. The inner boundary of the ergosphere is the event horizon, the spatial perimeter beyond which light cannot escape.

Inside the ergosphere even light cannot keep up with the rotation of the black hole, as the trajectories of stationary (from the outside perspective) objects become space-like, rather than time-like (that normal matter would have), or light-like. Mathematically, the dt^{2} component of the metric changes its sign inside the ergosphere. That allows matter to have negative energy inside of the ergosphere as long as it moves counter the black hole's rotation fast enough (or, from outside perspective, resists being dragged along to a sufficient degree). The Penrose mechanism exploits that by diving into the ergosphere, dumping an object that was given negative energy, and returning with more energy than before.

In this way, rotational energy is extracted from the black hole, resulting in the black hole being spun down to a lower rotational speed. The maximum amount of energy (per mass of the thrown in object) is extracted if the black hole is rotating at the maximal rate, the object just grazes the event horizon and decays into forwards and backwards moving packets of light (the first escapes the black hole, the second falls inside).

In an adjunct process, a black hole can be spun up (its rotational speed increased) by sending in particles that do not split up, but instead give their entire angular momentum to the black hole. However, this is not a reverse of the Penrose process, as both increase the entropy of the black hole by throwing material into it.

== See also ==
- Blandford–Znajek process – Explanation for how quasars are powered
- Hawking radiation – Hypothetical quantum cosmological effect
- High Life, a 2018 science-fiction film that includes a mission to harness the process
- Black hole bomb – Physical effect when superradiant modes are confined around a rotating black hole
- Hills mechanism – Black hole effect on a binary star
- Zeldovich amplification – Wave amplification in rotating objects
