= Kerr–Newman metric =

Solution of Einstein field equations

The Kerr–Newman metric describes the spacetime geometry around a mass that is electrically charged and rotating. It is a vacuum solution that generalizes the Kerr metric (which describes an uncharged, rotating mass) by additionally taking into account the energy of an electromagnetic field, making it the most general asymptotically flat and stationary solution of the Einstein–Maxwell equations in general relativity. As an electrovacuum solution, it only includes those charges associated with the magnetic field; it does not include any free electric charges.

The Kerr–Newman metric is primarily of theoretical interest. Astronomical objects have axes for rotation and for magnetic fields, but the metric is only valid for co-aligned axes. The model lacks description of infalling baryonic matter, light (null dusts) or dark matter, and thus provides an incomplete description of stellar mass black holes and active galactic nuclei. The solution however is of mathematical interest and provides a fairly simple cornerstone for further exploration.

== History ==
In December of 1963, Roy Kerr and Alfred Schild found the Kerr–Schild metrics that gave all Einstein spaces that are exact linear perturbations of Minkowski space. In early 1964, Kerr looked for all Einstein–Maxwell spaces with this same property. By February of 1964, the special case where the Kerr–Schild spaces were charged (including the Kerr–Newman solution) was known but the general case where the special directions were not geodesics of the underlying Minkowski space proved very difficult. The problem was given to George Debney to try to solve but was given up by March 1964. About this time Ezra T. Newman found the solution for charged Kerr by guesswork. In 1965, Ezra "Ted" Newman found the axisymmetric solution of Einstein's field equation for a black hole which is both rotating and electrically charged. This formula for the metric tensor is called the Kerr–Newman metric. It is a generalisation of the Kerr metric for an uncharged spinning point-mass, which had been discovered by Roy Kerr two years earlier.

== Overview of the solution ==
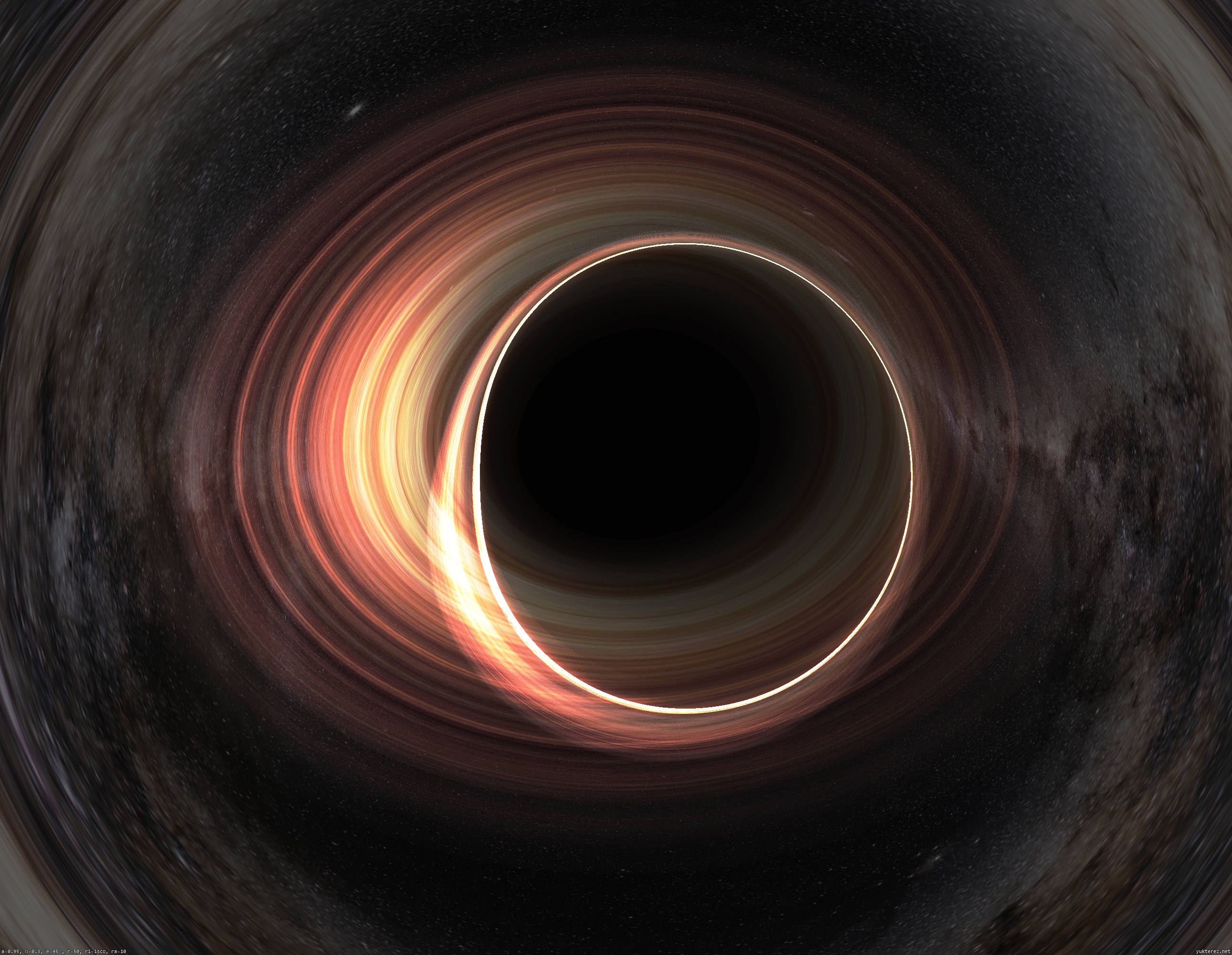
Ray traced shadow of a spinning and charged black hole with an accretion disk and parameters a/M = 0.95, Q/M = 0.3. The left side of the black hole is rotating towards the observer, the tilt of the rotation axis relative to the observer is 45°.

Newman's result represents the simplest stationary, axisymmetric, asymptotically flat solution of Einstein's equations in the presence of an electromagnetic field in four dimensions. It is sometimes referred to as an "electrovacuum" solution of Einstein's equations.

The solution contains a singularity in the shape of a ring. The multipole structure of the solution suggests that the solution represents the field of a ring of charge rotating about its axis of symmetry. Similarly the Kerr solution represents the field of a ring of mass. However, for this simple view to be mathematically correct, charge (or mass in the Kerr case) needs to be distributed around the singular ring of the solution to break the multivalued behavior.

Any Kerr–Newman source has its rotation axis aligned with its magnetic axis. Thus, a Kerr–Newman source is different from commonly observed astronomical bodies, for which there is a substantial angle between the rotation axis and the magnetic moment. Specifically, neither the Sun, nor any of the planets in the Solar System has its magnetic field dipole aligned with its spin axis. Thus, while the Kerr solution describes the gravitational field of the Sun and planets, the magnetic fields necessarily arise by a different process.

== Limiting cases ==
The Kerr–Newman metric can be seen to reduce to other exact solutions in general relativity in limiting cases. It reduces to

- the Kerr metric as the charge Q goes to zero;
- the Reissner–Nordström metric as the angular momentum J (or a = J/M) goes to zero;
- the Schwarzschild metric as both the charge Q and the angular momentum J (or a) are taken to zero; and
- Minkowski space if the mass M, the charge Q, and the rotational parameter a are all zero.

The four related solutions may be summarized by the following table:

	Non-rotating (J = 0)	Rotating (any J)
Uncharged (Q = 0)	Schwarzschild	Kerr
Charged (any Q)	Reissner–Nordström	Kerr–Newman

where Q is the body's electric charge and J is its spin angular momentum.

Taking the gravitational constant G to be zero in the Kerr–Newman solution gives an electromagnetic field from a rotating charged disk with a boundary in a Minkowski space. The Kerr–Newman solution itself is a special case of more general exact solutions of the Einstein–Maxwell equations. The more general solutions include a cosmological constant, a Newman, Unti, Tamburino (NUT) parameter, and a magnetic charge.

== Metric field ==
The Kerr–Newman metric describes the geometry of spacetime for a rotating charged black hole with mass M, charge Q and angular momentum J. The formula for this metric depends upon what coordinates or coordinate conditions are selected. Two forms are given below: Boyer–Lindquist coordinates, and Kerr–Schild coordinates. The gravitational metric alone is not sufficient to determine a solution to the Einstein field equations; the electromagnetic stress tensor must be given as well. Both are provided in each section.

== Boyer–Lindquist coordinates ==
One way to express this metric is by writing down its line element in a particular set of spherical coordinates, also called Boyer–Lindquist coordinates:

$$c^{2} d\tau^{2} =
-\left(\frac{dr^2}{\Delta} + d\theta^2 \right) \rho^2 + \left(c \, dt - a \sin^2 \theta \, d\phi \right)^2 \frac{\Delta}{\rho^2} - \left(\left(r^2 + a^2 \right) d\phi - a c\, dt \right)^2 \frac{\sin^2 \theta}{\rho^2},$$

where (r, θ, ϕ) are standard spherical coordinates, and the length scales:

$$a = \frac{J}{Mc}\,,$$
$$\rho^{2}=r^2+a^2\cos^2\theta\,,$$
$$\Delta=r^2-r_\text{s}r+a^2+r_Q^2\,,$$

have been introduced for brevity. Here r_{s} is the Schwarzschild radius of the massive body, which is related to its total mass-equivalent M by

$$r_\text{s} = \frac{2GM}{c^{2}},$$

where G is the gravitational constant, and r_{Q} is a length scale corresponding to the electric charge Q of the mass

$$r_{Q}^{2} = \frac{Q^{2}G}{4\pi\epsilon_{0} c^{4}},$$

where ε_{0} is the vacuum permittivity.

=== Electromagnetic field tensor in Boyer–Lindquist form ===
The electromagnetic potential in Boyer–Lindquist coordinates is

$$A_{\mu}=\left( \frac{r \ r_Q }{\rho^2},0,0,-\frac{\ a \ r \ r_Q  \sin ^2 \theta }{\rho^2 } \right)$$

while the Maxwell tensor is defined by

$$F_{\mu\nu} = \frac{\partial A_\nu}{\partial x^{\mu}} - \frac{\partial A_\mu}{\partial x^{\nu}} \ \to \ F^{\mu\nu}=g^{\mu\sigma} \ g^{\nu\kappa} \ F_{\sigma \kappa}$$

In combination with the Christoffel symbols the second order equations of motion can be derived with

$${{\ddot x^i = - \Gamma^i_{j k} \ {\dot x^j} \ {\dot x^k} + q \ {F^{i k}} \ {\dot x^j}} \ {g_{j k}}},$$

where $q$ is the charge-to-mass ratio of the test particle.

== Kerr–Schild coordinates ==
The Kerr–Newman metric can be expressed in the Kerr–Schild form, using a particular set of Cartesian coordinates, proposed by Kerr and Schild in 1965. The metric is as follows.

$$g_{\mu \nu} = \eta_{\mu \nu} + fk_{\mu}k_{\nu} \!$$
$$f = \frac{Gr^2}{r^4 + a^2z^2}\left[2Mr - Q^2 \right]$$
$$\mathbf{k} = ( k_{x} ,k_{y} ,k_{z} ) = \left( \frac{rx+ay}{r^2 + a^2} , \frac{ry-ax}{r^2 + a^2}, \frac{z}{r} \right)$$
$$k_{0} = 1. \!$$

Here, k is a unit vector. Here M is the constant mass of the spinning object, Q is the constant charge of the spinning object, η is the Minkowski metric, and a = J/M is a constant rotational parameter of the spinning object. It is understood that the vector $\vec{a}$ is directed along the positive z-axis, i.e. $\vec{a} = a \hat{z}$. The quantity r is not the radius, but rather is implicitly defined by the relation

$$1 = \frac{x^2+y^2}{r^2 + a^2} + \frac{z^2}{r^2}.$$

The quantity r becomes the usual radius R

$$r \to R = \sqrt{x^2 + y^2 + z^2}$$

when the rotational parameter a approaches zero. In this form of solution, units are selected so that the speed of light is unity (c = 1). In order to provide a complete solution of the Einstein–Maxwell equations, the Kerr–Newman solution not only includes a formula for the metric tensor, but also a formula for the electromagnetic potential:

$$A_{\mu} = \frac{Qr^3}{r^4 + a^2z^2}k_{\mu}$$

At large distances from the source (R ≫ a), these equations reduce to the Reissner–Nordström metric with:

$$A_{\mu} = \frac{Q}{R}k_{\mu}$$

In the Kerr–Schild form of the Kerr–Newman metric, the determinant of the metric tensor is everywhere equal to negative one, even near the source.

=== Electromagnetic fields in Kerr–Schild form ===
The electric and magnetic fields can be obtained in the usual way by differentiating the four-potential to obtain the electromagnetic field strength tensor. It will be convenient to switch over to three-dimensional vector notation.

$$A_{\mu} = \left(-\phi, A_x, A_y, A_z \right) \,$$

The static electric and magnetic fields are derived from the vector potential and the scalar potential like this:

$$\vec{E} = - \vec{\nabla} \phi \,$$
$$\vec{B} = \vec{\nabla} \times \vec{A} \,$$

Using the Kerr–Newman formula for the four-potential in the Kerr–Schild form, in the limit of the mass going to zero, yields the following concise complex formula for the fields:

$$\vec{E} + i\vec{B} = -\vec{\nabla}\Omega\,$$
$$\Omega = \frac{Q}{\sqrt{(\vec{R}-i\vec{a})^2}} \,$$

The quantity omega (Ω) in this last equation is similar to the Coulomb potential, except that the radius vector is shifted by an imaginary amount. This complex potential was discussed as early as the nineteenth century, by the French mathematician Paul Émile Appell.

== Irreducible mass ==
The total mass-equivalent M, which contains the electric field-energy and the rotational energy, and the irreducible mass M_{irr} are related by

$$M_{\rm irr} = \frac{1}{2}\sqrt{2 M^2-r^2_Q c^4/G^2+2 M \sqrt{M^2-(r^2_Q +a^2) c^4/G^2}}$$

which can be solved to obtain

$$M = \frac{4 M_{\rm irr}^2+r^2_Q c^4/G^2}{2\sqrt{4 M_{\rm irr}^2- a^2 c^4/G^2}}$$

In order to electrically charge and/or spin a neutral and static body, energy has to be applied to the system. Due to the mass–energy equivalence, this energy also has a mass-equivalent; therefore M is always higher than M_{irr}. If for example the rotational energy of a black hole is extracted via the Penrose processes, the remaining mass–energy will always stay greater than or equal to M_{irr}.

== Important surfaces ==
Event horizons and ergospheres of a charged and spinning black hole in pseudospherical (r, θ, φ) and cartesian (x, y, z) coordinates.

Setting $1 / g_{rr}$ to 0 and solving for $r$ gives the inner and outer event horizon, which is located at the Boyer–Lindquist coordinate

$$r_{\text{H}}^{\pm} = \frac{r_{\rm s}}{2} \pm \sqrt{\frac{r_{\rm s}^2}{4} - a^2 - r_Q^2}.$$

Repeating this step with $g_{tt}$ gives the inner and outer ergosurface

$$r_{\text{E}}^{\pm} = \frac{r_{\rm s}}{2} \pm \sqrt{\frac{r_{\rm s}^2}{4} - a^2 \cos^2\theta - r_Q^2}.$$

The region between the event horizon and the ergosurface is called the ergosphere. Within the ergosphere all local light cones are tilted in the direction of rotation.

Test particle in orbit around a spinning and charged black hole (a/M = 0.9, Q/M = 0.4)

== Equations of motion ==
For brevity, we further use nondimensionalized quantities normalized against $G$, $M$, $c$ and $4\pi\epsilon_0$, where $a$ reduces to $Jc/G/M^2$ and $Q$ to $Q/(M\sqrt{4\pi\epsilon_0G})$, and the equations of motion for a test particle of charge $q$ become

$$\dot t \Delta  \rho^2 = \csc ^2 \theta \ ({L_z} (a \ \Delta  \sin ^2 \theta -a \ (a^2+r^2) \sin ^2 \theta )-q \ Q \ r \ (a^2+r^2) \sin ^2 \theta +E  ((a^2+r^2)^2 \sin ^2 \theta -a^2 \Delta  \sin ^4  \theta ))$$
$$\dot r \rho^2= \pm \left(((r^2+a^2) \ E - a \ L_z - q \ Q \ r)^2-\Delta \ (C+r^2)\right)^{1/2}$$
$$\dot \theta \rho^2 = \pm \left(C-(a \cos \theta)^2-(a \ \sin^2 \theta \ E-L_z)^2/\sin^2 \theta\right)^{1/2}$$
$$\dot \phi \rho^2 \ \Delta \ \sin^2\theta= E \ (a \ \sin^2 \theta \ (r^2+a^2)-a \ \sin^2 \theta \ \Delta)+L_z \ (\Delta-a^2 \ \sin^2 \theta)-q \ Q \ r \ a \ \sin^2 \theta$$

with $E$ for the total energy and $L_z$ for the axial angular momentum. $C$ is the Carter constant:

$$C = p_{\theta}^{2} + \cos^{2}\theta \left( a^{2}(\mu^2 - E^{2}) + \frac{L_z^2}{ \sin^2\theta}\right) = a^2 \ (\mu^2-E^2) \ \sin^2 \delta + L_z^2 \ \tan^2 \delta = {\rm const},$$

where $p_{\theta} = \dot \theta \ \rho^2$ is the poloidial component of the test particle's angular momentum, and $\delta$ the orbital inclination angle.

$$L_z = p_{\phi}=-g_{\phi \phi} {\dot{\phi}}-g_{t \phi} {\dot{t}} - q \ A_{\phi} = \frac{v^{\phi} \ \bar R}{\sqrt{1-\mu^2 v^2}}+\frac{(1-\mu^2 v^2) \ a \ r \ \mho \ q \ \sin ^2 \theta }{\Sigma } = {\rm const.}$$

and

$$E = -p_t =g_{tt} {\dot{t}}+g_{t \phi} {\dot{\phi}} + q \ A_{t} = \sqrt{\frac{\Delta \ \rho^2}{(1-\mu^2 v^2) \ \chi}} + \Omega \ L_z +\frac{\mho \ q \ r }{\Sigma} = {\rm const.}$$

with $\mu^2=0$ and $\mu^2=1$ for particles are also conserved quantities.

$$\Omega = -\frac{g_{t\phi}}{g_{\phi\phi}} = \frac{a \left(2 r-Q^2\right)}{\chi }$$

is the frame dragging induced angular velocity. The shorthand term $\chi$ is defined by

$$\chi = \left(a ^2+r^2\right)^2-a ^2 \ \sin ^2 \theta  \ \Delta.$$

The relation between the coordinate derivatives $\dot r, \ \dot \theta, \ \dot \phi$ and the local 3-velocity $v$ is

$$v^{r} = \dot r \ \sqrt{\frac{\rho^2 \ (1-\mu^2 v^2)}{\Delta}}$$

for the radial,

$$v^{\theta} = \dot \theta \ \sqrt{\rho^2 \ (1-\mu^2 v^2) }$$

for the poloidial,

$$v^{\phi} = \sqrt{1-\mu^2 v^2} \left(L_z \ \Sigma - a \ q \ Q \ r \left( 1-\mu^2 v^2 \right) \sin^2 \theta \right)\cdot(\bar{R} \ \Sigma )^{-1}$$

for the axial and

$$v =  \frac{\sqrt{\dot t^2-\varsigma^2}}{\dot t} = \sqrt{\frac{\chi \ (E-L_z \ \Omega )^2 -\Delta \ \rho^2}{\chi \ (E-L_z \ \Omega )^2}}$$

for the total local velocity, where

$$\bar R = \sqrt{-g_{\phi \phi}} = \sqrt{\frac{\chi}{\rho^2}} \ \sin \theta$$

is the axial radius of gyration (local circumference divided by 2π), and

$$\varsigma = \sqrt{g^{t t}}  = \frac{\chi }{\Delta \ \rho^2}$$

the gravitational time dilation component. The local radial escape velocity for a neutral particle is therefore

$$v_{\rm esc}=\frac{\sqrt{\varsigma^2-1}}{\varsigma} .$$

== Extremal solutions and naked singularity ==
For the set of parameters $M^2 - (J/M)^2 - Q^2 = 0$ the solution is called "extremal"; in the super-extremal regime, $M^2 - (J/M)^2 - Q^2 < 0$, there is no event horizon and the interior singularity is observable as a naked singularity. That is, the Kerr–Newman metric defines a black hole with an event horizon only when the combined charge and angular momentum are sufficiently small compared to the mass.

An electron's rotational parameter a and charge length scale r_{Q} both far exceed its Schwarzschild radius r_{s}, which implies that there is no event horizon, so a "black hole electron" would necessarily be a naked spinning ring singularity. Such a metric has several seemingly unphysical properties, such as the ring's violation of the cosmic censorship hypothesis and appearance of causality-violating closed timelike curves in the immediate vicinity of the ring.

== Dirac–Kerr–Newman electron model ==
In an analysis of the Kerr–Newman solution for a rotating charged body, Brandon Carter remarked that the solutions predict a gyromagnetic ratio of 2, equal to that predicted by the relativistic quantum-mechanical Dirac equation, and close to that experimentally observed for the electron. This led to the application of the Kerr–Newman metric to create non-quantum models of the electron based on general relativity. The electron and all similar particles have large charge-to-mass ratios, which have Kerr–Newman parameters in the regime where there is no event horizon but there is a naked singularity. For example, for the electron the charge-to-mass ratio 2r_{Q} / r_{s} ≈ 10^{21} and the spin effects are both orders of magnitude larger than this limit.

If the Kerr–Newman potential is considered as a classical model for an electron it predicts an electron having not only a magnetic dipole moment, but also other multipole moments, such as an electric quadrupole moment. However, no experimental measurements of such a quadrupole moment have been reported.

== Bibliography ==
- Wald, Robert M. (1984). General Relativity. Chicago: The University of Chicago Press. pp. 312–324. ISBN 978-0-226-87032-8.
