= Clifford–Klein form =

In mathematics, a Clifford–Klein form is a double coset space

Γ\G/H,

where G is a reductive Lie group, H a closed subgroup of G, and Γ a discrete subgroup of G that acts properly discontinuously on the homogeneous space G/H. A suitable discrete subgroup Γ may or may not exist, for a given G and H. If Γ exists, there is the question of whether Γ\G/H can be taken to be a compact space, called a compact Clifford–Klein form.

When H is itself compact, classical results show that a compact Clifford–Klein form exists. Otherwise it may not, and there are a number of negative results.

== History ==
According to Moritz Epple, the Clifford-Klein forms began when W. K. Clifford used quaternions to twist their space. "Every twist possessed a space-filling family of invariant lines", the Clifford parallels. They formed "a particular structure embedded in elliptic 3-space", the Clifford surface, which demonstrated that "the same local geometry may be tied to spaces that are globally different". Wilhelm Killing thought that for free mobility of rigid bodies there are four spaces: Euclidean, hyperbolic, elliptic and spherical. They are spaces of constant curvature but constant curvature differs from free mobility: it is local, the other is both local and global. Killing's contribution to Clifford-Klein space forms involved formulation in terms of groups, finding new classes of examples, and consideration of the scientific relevance of spaces of constant curvature. He took up the task to develop physical theories of CK space forms. Karl Schwarzchild wrote "The admissible measure of the curvature of space", and noted in an appendix that physical space may actually be a non-standard space of constant curvature.

== See also ==
- Killing–Hopf theorem
- Space form
