= Komar =

Komar may refer to:

== Places ==
- Komar, Iran (disambiguation), places in Iran
- Komar, mountain in central Bosnia, near Travnik
- Komar, Donji Vakuf, village in central Bosnia, between Travnik and Donji Vakuf
- Komar, Travnik, village in central Bosnia
- Komar, Altai Krai, Russia
- Komar, Ukraine, village in eastern Ukraine

== Other ==
- Komar (surname)
- Komar class missile boat of the USSR
- RPG-76 Komar, a Polish anti-tank grenade launcher
- IS-B Komar, a Polish glider
- Komar mass
- Komar superpotential

== See also ==
- Komarr, a science fiction novel by Lois McMaster Bujold
- Komaram Bheem (1900–1940), Indian independence activist
