= Curvature collineation =

Vector field that preserves the Riemann tensor

A curvature collineation (often abbreviated to CC) is vector field which preserves the Riemann tensor in the sense that,

$$\mathcal{L}_X R^a{}_{bcd}=0$$

where $R^a{}_{bcd}$ are the components of the Riemann tensor. The set of all smooth curvature collineations forms a Lie algebra under the Lie bracket operation (if the smoothness condition is dropped, the set of all curvature collineations need not form a Lie algebra). The Lie algebra is denoted by $CC(M)$ and may be infinite-dimensional. Every affine vector field is a curvature collineation.

== See also ==
- Conformal vector field
- Homothetic vector field
- Killing vector field
- Matter collineation
- Spacetime symmetries
