= Matter collineation =

Vector field

A matter collineation (sometimes matter symmetry and abbreviated to MC) is a vector field that satisfies the condition,

$$\mathcal{L}_X T_{ab}=0$$

where $T_{ab}$ are the energy–momentum tensor components.

There is a "general plain symmetric metric" and 10 "equations for plane symmetric spacetime". The connections between symmetries and General Relativity has been studied extensively since 1993.

The intimate relation between geometry and physics may be highlighted here, as the vector field $X$ is regarded as preserving certain physical quantities along the flow lines of $X$, this being true for any two observers. In connection with this, it may be shown that every Killing vector field is a matter collineation (by the Einstein field equations (EFE), with or without cosmological constant). Thus, given a solution of the EFE, a vector field that preserves the metric necessarily preserves the corresponding energy-momentum tensor. When the energy-momentum tensor represents a perfect fluid, every Killing vector field preserves the energy density, pressure and the fluid flow vector field.

When the energy-momentum tensor represents an electromagnetic field, a Killing vector field does not necessarily preserve the electric and magnetic fields. Likewise, a matter collineation is not necessarily a homothetic vector.

== See also ==
- Affine vector field
- Conformal vector field
- Curvature collineation
- Homothetic vector field
- Spacetime symmetries
