= CKV =

CKV can refer to:

- CKV, IATA airport code for Clarksville–Montgomery County Regional Airport
- Conformal Killing vector field, sometimes shortened to conformal Killing vector or just CKV, a vector field in conformal geometry
