= Affine vector field =

Type of vector field

An affine vector field (sometimes affine collineation or affine) is a projective vector field preserving geodesics and preserving the affine parameter. Mathematically, this is expressed by the following condition:

$$(\mathcal{L}_X g_{ab})_{;c}=0$$

== See also ==
- Conformal vector field
- Curvature collineation
- Homothetic vector field
- Killing vector field
- Matter collineation
- Spacetime symmetries
