= Alice Sterling Honig =

American college professor (1929–2023)

- Born: April 19, 1929; New York City, New York, US
- Died: March 7, 2023 (aged 93); Michigan, US
- Education: Syracuse University; Columbia University; Barnard College; Cornell University
- Occupations: College professor, child and family psychologist
- Employer: Syracuse University
- Partner: Arthur Komar

Alice Sterling Honig (April 19, 1929 – March 7, 2023) was an American college professor and child psychologist. She was a professor of child development at Syracuse University.

== Early life and education ==
Honig was born in New York City, the daughter of William Sterling and Ida Bender Sterling. Both of her parents were Jewish immigrants from Eastern Europe. Her father worked in the garment trade and her mother was a teacher. She graduated from Erasmus Hall High School in Brooklyn. She attended Cornell University after school, but left to marry. Later, she graduated from Barnard College, and earned a master's degree from Columbia University. She earned a Ph.D. in developmental psychology from Syracuse University, where she was a graduate assistant of Bettye Caldwell.

== Career ==
Honig was a professor of child development at Syracuse University, program director of the school's Children's Center, and for over 30 years the director of Syracuse's National Quality Infant/Toddler Caregiving Workshop, a summer intensive program. She and pediatrician Frank Oski studied iron deficiency in infants and toddlers in the 1970s and 1980s. In 1975 she was part of a team of American child development specialists to visit China for a cross-cultural study trip. The Alice Sterling Honig Graduate Research Award is given annually to an outstanding Syracuse student in her field.

Honig was active in the Syracuse University Oratorio Society, and had a broad knowledge of Yiddish folksongs, and lullabies from around the world. She gave interviews and opinions, especially to columnist Lawrence Kutner, on children's television, dawdling, babysitters, baby gym classes, overscheduling, and peer pressure, among other topics. In 2015, she received the Woman of Achievement award from Barnard College alumnae association.

== Publications ==
Honig was a prolific author, with over 600 articles and book chapters under her name. She was still publishing articles in academic journals into her nineties. Honig was associate editor of Early Child Development and Care, and edited the review section of Young Children. Books by Honig include:

- Parent Involvement in Early Childhood Education (1975)
- Optimizing Early Child Care and Education (1990)
- Talking with Your Baby: Family as the First School (1996, with Holly Brophy)
- Secure Relationships: Nurturing Infant/toddler Attachment in Early Care Settings (2002)
- Little Kids, Big Worries: Stress-Busting Tips for Early Childhood Classrooms (2009)
- The Best for Babies: Expert Advice for Assessing Infant-Toddler Programs (2014)
- Experiencing Nature with Young Children (2015)
- Literacy, Storytelling and Bilingualism in Asian Classrooms (2018)
- Day-to-Day the Relationship Way: Creating Responsive Programs for Infants and Toddlers (2020, with Donna Wittmer)

== Personal life ==
Alice Sterling married Syracuse physics professor Arnold Honig. They had three children, Lawrence, Madeleine, and Jonathan. They later divorced. Her longtime partner, Arthur B. Komar, was also a physics professor; he died in 2011. (In an unusual family arrangement, her ex-husband was married to Komar's ex-wife.)

She died in 2023, at the age of 93, in Michigan. Her son-in-law is evolutionary biologist Richard Lenski of Michigan State University.
