= Killing spinor =

Type of Dirac operator eigenspinor

Killing spinor is a term used in mathematics and physics.

== Definition ==
By the more narrow definition, commonly used in mathematics, the term Killing spinor indicates those twistor spinors which are also eigenspinors of the Dirac operator. The term is named after Wilhelm Killing.

Another equivalent definition is that Killing spinors are the solutions to the Killing equation for a so-called Killing number.

More formally:

A Killing spinor on a Riemannian spin manifold M is a spinor field $\psi$ which satisfies

$$\nabla_X\psi=\lambda X\cdot\psi$$

for all tangent vectors X, where $\nabla$ is the spinor covariant derivative, $\cdot$ is Clifford multiplication and $\lambda \in \mathbb{C}$ is a constant, called the Killing number of $\psi$. If $\lambda=0$ then the spinor is called a parallel spinor.

== Applications ==
In physics, Killing spinors are used in supergravity and superstring theory, in particular for finding solutions which preserve some supersymmetry. They are a special kind of spinor field related to Killing vector fields and Killing tensors.

== Properties ==
If $\mathcal{M}$ is a manifold with a Killing spinor, then $\mathcal{M}$ is an Einstein manifold with Ricci curvature $Ric=4(n-1)\alpha^2$, where $\alpha$ is the Killing constant.

=== Types of Killing spinor fields ===
If $\alpha$ is purely imaginary, then $\mathcal{M}$ is a noncompact manifold; if $\alpha$ is 0, then the spinor field is parallel; finally, if $\alpha$ is real, then $\mathcal{M}$ is compact, and the spinor field is called a "real spinor field".

== Books ==
- Lawson, H. Blaine; Michelsohn, Marie-Louise (1989). Spin Geometry. Princeton University Press. ISBN 978-0-691-08542-5.
- Friedrich, Thomas (2000), Dirac Operators in Riemannian Geometry, American Mathematical Society, ISBN 978-0-8218-2055-1
