= Homothetic =

Homothetic may refer to:

== Geometry ==
- Homothetic transformation, also known as homothety, homothecy, or homogeneous dilation
- Homothetic center
- Homothetic vector field

== Economics ==
- Homothetic preferences
