= Geroch group =

Group of solutions to Einstein field equations

The Geroch group is an infinite-dimensional symmetry group of axisymmetric, stationary vacuum spacetimes that are solutions of Einstein's equations of general relativity. It is generated by two non-commuting subgroups: the Matzner–Misner group (after Richard Alfred Matzner and Charles W. Misner) of linear combinations (with constant coefficients) of the two Killing vector fields associated with the spacetime's axisymmetry and stationarity, and the Ehlers group.

== See also ==
- Robert Geroch
- Bondi–Metzner–Sachs group
- Spacetime symmetries

== Bibliography ==
- Breitenlohner, Peter; Maison, Dieter (1987), "On the Geroch group" (PDF), Annales de l'Institut Henri Poincaré A, 46 (2): 215–246
