= Mass in general relativity =

Facet of general relativity

In general relativity, the notion of mass is more subtle than in classical mechanics or special relativity. The theory itself does not single out a preferred local definition of mass, and several distinct notions of mass have been introduced that are applicable under different geometric or physical circumstances. This subtlety stems from the fact that the energy and momentum of the gravitational field cannot be unambiguously localized.

As a consequence, mass in general relativity cannot be defined as a local quantity in the same sense as in Newtonian physics, since there is no invariant local energy density for the gravitational field. Instead, notions of mass are recovered indirectly from global or boundary data, which typically requires additional geometric structure, such as symmetries or assumptions about the asymptotic behavior of spacetime. Well-defined notions of total mass exist in important classes of spacetimes, such as asymptotically flat spacetimes and asymptotically anti-de Sitter spacetimes, where suitable boundary conditions allow for a meaningful definition. Other settings require different or more refined constructions.

== Conceptual obstacles ==
In special relativity, the rest mass of a particle can be defined unambiguously in terms of its energy and momentum (see Mass in special relativity). In general relativity, however, extending the notions of energy and momentum is substantially more subtle. The key difficulty is that the gravitational field itself contributes to the total energy and momentum of a system.

Unlike other physical fields, the gravitational field does not possess a generally covariant local energy–momentum density. The stress–energy tensor describes only non-gravitational matter fields, while contributions associated with gravity are encoded in the geometry of spacetime through the Einstein field equations. Although in certain coordinate systems parts of the gravitational contribution can be represented using a stress–energy–momentum pseudotensor, such constructions are observer-dependent and do not yield a generally accepted local notion of gravitational energy.

An important requirement for any such definition is positivity, or at least the existence of a lower bound. If the total mass of an isolated system were unbounded from below, no configuration could be absolutely stable. This principle is made precise by the Positive energy theorem, which states that, under suitable energy conditions, the total mass of an asymptotically flat spacetime is non-negative and vanishes only for Minkowski space. This result plays a fundamental role in the mathematical and physical understanding of mass in general relativity.

== Types of mass in general relativity ==
Several distinct notions of mass arise in general relativity, depending on the presence of symmetries, the asymptotic structure of spacetime, or the scale at which the gravitational field is probed.

=== Komar mass in stationary spacetimes ===
A non-technical definition of a stationary spacetime is a spacetime where none of the metric coefficients $g_{\mu\nu}\,$ are functions of time. The Schwarzschild metric of a black hole and the Kerr metric of a rotating black hole are common examples of stationary spacetimes.

By definition, a stationary spacetime exhibits time translation symmetry. This is technically called a time-like Killing vector. Because the system has a time translation symmetry, Noether's theorem guarantees that it has a conserved energy. Because a stationary system also has a well defined rest frame in which its momentum can be considered to be zero, defining the energy of the system also defines its mass. In general relativity, this mass is called the Komar mass of the system. Komar mass can only be defined for stationary systems.

Komar mass can also be defined by a flux integral. This is similar to the way that Gauss's law defines the charge enclosed by a surface as the normal electric force multiplied by the area. The flux integral used to define Komar mass is slightly different from that used to define the electric field, however – the normal force is not the actual force, but the "force at infinity". See the main article for more detail.

Of the two definitions, the description of Komar mass in terms of a time translation symmetry provides the deepest insight.

=== ADM and Bondi masses in asymptotically flat space-times ===
If a system containing gravitational sources is surrounded by an infinite vacuum region, the geometry of spacetime approaches that of flat Minkowski spacetime at large distances. Such spacetimes are called asymptotically flat spacetimes. In this setting, one can define global notions of energy, momentum, and mass associated with the gravitational field.

In an asymptotically flat spacetime, one may consider spacelike hypersurfaces whose induced geometry is asymptotically flat in a suitable sense. On such hypersurfaces, the Hamiltonian formulation of general relativity leads to conserved quantities associated with the asymptotic symmetries of the spacetime. In particular, by an asymptotic version of Noether's theorem, time translations and spatial translations at infinity give rise to conserved energy and momentum, known as the ADM energy and ADM momentum.

The ADM energy and momentum together form an energy–momentum four-vector $P^\mu = (E_{\mathrm{ADM}}, P^i_{\mathrm{ADM}})$. The ADM mass is then defined as the Lorentz-invariant norm of this four-vector, $M_{\mathrm{ADM}} = \sqrt{E_{\mathrm{ADM}}^2 - |P_{\mathrm{ADM}}|^2},$ and represents the total mass–energy content of an isolated gravitating system as measured at spatial infinity. Under suitable conditions, the ADM quantities are independent of the particular asymptotically flat spacelike hypersurface chosen.

Closely related notions can be defined at null infinity. These are known as the Bondi energy, momentum, and mass, and describe the mass of an isolated system as measured by distant observers along outgoing null directions. In contrast to the ADM mass, the Bondi mass can decrease in time due to the emission of gravitational radiation.

One convenient way to compute the ADM energy–momentum is through flux integrals evaluated on large two-dimensional surfaces approaching spatial infinity. When expressed in asymptotically Cartesian coordinates, the spacetime metric can be written near infinity in the form

$$g_{\mu \nu} = \eta_{\mu \nu} + h_{\mu \nu},$$

where $\eta_{\mu \nu}$ is the flat Minkowski metric and $h_{\mu \nu}$ represents deviations that decay suitably at infinity. These expressions provide a coordinate realization of the Hamiltonian definitions given above.

In this formulation, the ADM energy $E_{\mathrm{ADM}} = P^0$ is given by the flux integral

$$P^0 = \frac{1}{16 \pi G} \int \left(\partial^k h_{j k} - \partial^j h_{k k} \right) d^2 S_j,$$

where $S$ is a large sphere at spatial infinity, $S_j$ denotes its outward-pointing unit normal, and the Einstein summation convention is assumed over spatial indices. Ordinary derivatives appear in this expression because the metric is assumed to approach the flat metric asymptotically.

Some intuition for this formula can be obtained by considering spherical surfaces of large radius $r$. At large distances from the sources, the components of $h_{ij}$ typically decay as $r^{-1}$, so their derivatives decay as $r^{-2}$. Since the area of the sphere grows as $r^2$, the resulting integral converges to a finite value.

Expressions for the ADM momentum can be obtained in a similar manner. One introduces the tensor

$$H^{\mu \alpha \nu \beta} = -\bar{h}^{\mu \nu} \eta^{\alpha \beta}
- \eta^{\mu \nu} \bar{h}^{\alpha \beta}
+ \bar{h}^{\alpha \nu} \eta^{\mu \beta}
+ \bar{h}^{\mu \beta} \eta^{\alpha \nu},$$

where

$$\bar{h}_{\mu \nu} = h_{\mu \nu} - \tfrac{1}{2} \eta_{\mu \nu} h^{\alpha}_{\alpha}.$$

The ADM energy–momentum four-vector is then obtained from the flux integral

$$P^{\mu} = \frac{1}{16 \pi G} \int \partial_{\alpha} H^{\mu \alpha 0 j} \, d^2 S_j.$$

The expression for $P^0$ obtained from this formula coincides with the ADM energy defined above.

=== The Newtonian limit for nearly flat space-times ===
In the Newtonian limit, for quasi-static systems in nearly flat space-times, one can approximate the total energy of the system by adding together the non-gravitational components of the energy of the system and then subtracting the Newtonian gravitational binding energy.

Translating the above statement into the language of general relativity, we say that a system in nearly flat space-time has a total non-gravitational energy E and momentum P given by:

$$E = \int_v T_{00} dV \qquad P^i = \int_V T_{0i} dV$$

When the components of the momentum vector of the system are zero, i.e. P^{i} = 0, the approximate mass of the system is just (E+E_{binding})/c^{2}, E_{binding} being a negative number representing the Newtonian gravitational self-binding energy.

Hence when one assumes that the system is quasi-static, one assumes that there is no significant energy present in the form of "gravitational waves". When one assumes that the system is in "nearly-flat" space-time, one assumes that the metric coefficients are essentially Minkowskian within acceptable experimental error.

The formulas for the total energy and momentum can be seen to arise naturally in this limit as follows. In the linearized limit, the equations of general relativity can be written in the form

$$\partial_{\alpha} \partial_{\beta} H^{\mu \alpha \nu \beta} = 16 \pi G T^{\mu \nu}$$

In this limit, the total energy-momentum of the system is simply given by integrating the stress-tensor on a spacelike slice.

$$P^{\mu} = \int T^{\mu 0} d^3 x$$

But using the equations of motion, one can also write this as

$$P^{\mu} = {1 \over 16 \pi G} \int \partial_{\alpha} \partial_{\beta} H^{\mu \alpha 0 \beta} d^3 x = {1 \over 16 \pi G} \int \partial_{\alpha} \partial_j H^{\mu \alpha 0 j} d^3 x$$

where the sum over j runs only over the spatial directions and the second equality uses the fact that $H^{\mu \alpha \nu \beta}$ is anti-symmetric in $\nu$ and $\beta$. Finally, one uses the Gauss law to convert the integral of a divergence over the spatial slice into an integral over a Gaussian sphere

$${1 \over 16 \pi G} \int \partial_{\alpha} \partial_j H^{\mu \alpha 0 j} d^3 x = {1 \over 16 \pi G} \int \partial_{\alpha} H^{\mu \alpha 0 j} d^2 S_j$$

which coincides precisely with the formula for the total momentum given above.

In spacetimes where multiple notions of mass are simultaneously defined, these definitions are expected to agree. For example, in stationary asymptotically flat spacetimes, the Komar mass coincides with the ADM mass, while in the absence of gravitational radiation the Bondi mass also agrees with the ADM mass.

While these notions of mass are well defined in the presence of symmetries or suitable asymptotic conditions, they do not assign a mass to a finite region of spacetime. This limitation motivates the search for quasi-local notions of mass, discussed in the next section.

== Quasi-local quantities ==
A limitation of the mass definitions discussed above is that they are defined only at null or spatial infinity and therefore require information about the spacetime geometry arbitrarily far from the gravitating system. In realistic physical situations, such global information is generally unavailable, making such notions of mass difficult to interpret or measure without access to the entire system or a large portion of it. This has motivated the search for notions of mass that can be associated with a finite region of spacetime.

Since the 1970s, physicists and mathematicians have therefore pursued the more ambitious goal of defining suitable quasi-local quantities. A quasi-local mass is intended to measure the mass or energy contained within a region enclosed by a closed surface, using only geometric and physical data defined on or inside that surface. The term “quasi-local” reflects the fact that, while such quantities depend on a finite region rather than asymptotic infinity, they cannot be strictly local, since general relativity does not admit a well-defined local energy density for the gravitational field.

A wide variety of quasi-local mass and energy definitions have been proposed, including the Hawking energy, the Geroch energy, the Bartnik mass, the Brown–York mass, the Liu–Yau mass, and quasi-local energy–momentum constructions due to Roger Penrose based on twistor methods. The search for a fully satisfactory definition of quasi-local mass remains an open problem, and no single proposal is universally accepted. Different definitions emphasize different mathematical and physical features and are suited to different applications.

Despite these differences, it is generally expected that a physically meaningful quasi-local mass should satisfy certain basic requirements. These typically include non-negativity under appropriate energy conditions, agreement with the standard notions of total mass at infinity, and suitable rigidity properties. In particular, when evaluated on a sequence of surfaces approaching spatial or null infinity, a quasi-local mass should converge to the ADM mass or Bondi mass, respectively. Moreover, if a quasi-local mass vanishes on a surface, one expects the region enclosed by that surface to be flat, in the sense that it is isometric to a portion of Minkowski spacetime. Quasi-local quantities play an important role in mathematical relativity and are central to problems such as the formulation of the hoop conjecture, the proof of the Penrose inequality, and the development of quasi-local versions of the laws of black hole mechanics.

== History ==
In 1918, David Hilbert wrote about the difficulty in assigning an energy to a "field" and "the failure of the energy theorem" in a correspondence with Felix Klein. In this letter, Hilbert conjectured that this failure is a characteristic feature of the general theory, and that instead of "proper energy theorems" one had 'improper energy theorems'.

This conjecture was soon proved to be correct by one of Hilbert's close associates, Emmy Noether. Noether's theorem applies to any system which can be described by an action principle. Noether's theorem associates conserved energies with time-translation symmetries. When the time-translation symmetry is a finite parameter continuous group, such as the Poincaré group, Noether's theorem defines a scalar conserved energy for the system in question. However, when the symmetry is an infinite parameter continuous group, the existence of a conserved energy is not guaranteed. In a similar manner, Noether's theorem associates conserved momenta with space-translations, when the symmetry group of the translations is finite-dimensional. Because general relativity is a diffeomorphism invariant theory, it has an infinite continuous group of symmetries rather than a finite-parameter group of symmetries, and hence has the wrong group structure to guarantee a conserved energy. Noether's theorem has been influential in inspiring and unifying various ideas of mass, system energy, and system momentum in general relativity.

As an example of the application of Noether's theorem is the example of stationary space-times and their associated Komar mass.(Komar 1959). While general space-times lack a finite-parameter time-translation symmetry, stationary space-times have such a symmetry, known as a Killing vector. Noether's theorem proves that such stationary space-times must have an associated conserved energy. This conserved energy defines a conserved mass, the Komar mass.

ADM mass was introduced (Arnowitt et al., 1960) from an initial-value formulation of general relativity. It was later reformulated in terms of the group of asymptotic symmetries at spatial infinity, the SPI group, by various authors. (Held, 1980). This reformulation did much to clarify the theory, including explaining why ADM momentum and ADM energy transforms as a 4-vector (Held, 1980). Note that the SPI group is actually infinite-dimensional. The existence of conserved quantities is because the SPI group of "super-translations" has a preferred 4-parameter subgroup of "pure" translations, which, by Noether's theorem, generates a conserved 4-parameter energy–momentum. The norm of this 4-parameter energy–momentum is the ADM mass.

The Bondi mass was introduced (Bondi, 1962) in a paper that studied the loss of mass of physical systems via gravitational radiation. The Bondi mass is also associated with a group of asymptotic symmetries, the BMS group at null infinity. Like the SPI group at spatial infinity, the BMS group at null infinity is infinite-dimensional, and it also has a preferred 4-parameter subgroup of "pure" translations.

Another approach to the problem of energy in general relativity is the use of pseudotensors such as the Landau–Lifshitz pseudotensor.(Landau and Lifshitz, 1962). Pseudotensors are not gauge invariant – because of this, they only give consistent gauge-independent answers for the total energy when additional constraints (such as asymptotic flatness) are met. The gauge dependence of pseudotensors also prevents any gauge-independent definition of the local energy density, as every different gauge choice results in a different local energy density.

== See also ==
- ADM mass – Way to define the energy in general relativity
- Conservation of energy – Law of physics and chemistry
- General relativity – Theory of gravitation as curved spacetime
- Hawking energy – Proposed quasi-local mass in general relativity
- Komar mass – Concept of mass used in general relativity
- Mass in special relativity – Meanings of mass in special relativity
- Positive mass theorem – Key result in general relativity
