= Conformal Killing vector field =

Vector field in conformal geometry

In conformal geometry, a conformal Killing vector field on a manifold of dimension n with (pseudo) Riemannian metric $g$ (also called a conformal Killing vector, CKV, or conformal colineation), is a vector field $X$ whose (locally defined) flow defines conformal transformations, that is, preserve $g$ up to scale and preserve the conformal structure. Several equivalent formulations, called the conformal Killing equation, exist in terms of the Lie derivative of the flow e.g. $\mathcal{L}_{X}g = \lambda g$ for some function $\lambda$ on the manifold. For $n \ne 2$ there are a finite number of solutions, specifying the conformal symmetry of that space, but in two dimensions, there is an infinity of solutions. The name Killing refers to Wilhelm Killing, who first investigated Killing vector fields.

== Densitized metric tensor and Conformal Killing vectors ==
A vector field $X$ is a Killing vector field if and only if its flow preserves the metric tensor $g$ (strictly speaking for each compact subsets of the manifold, the flow need only be defined for finite time). Formulated mathematically, $X$ is Killing if and only if it satisfies

$$\mathcal{L}_X g = 0.$$

where $\mathcal{L}_X$ is the Lie derivative.

More generally, define a w-Killing vector field $X$ as a vector field whose (local) flow preserves the densitized metric $g\mu_g^w$, where $\mu_g$ is the volume density defined by $g$ (i.e. locally $\mu_g = \sqrt{|\det(g)|} \, dx^1\cdots dx^n$) and $w \in \mathbf{R}$ is its weight. Note that a Killing vector field preserves $\mu_g$ and so automatically also satisfies this more general equation. Also note that $w = -2/n$ is the unique weight that makes the combination $g \mu_g^w$ invariant under scaling of the metric. Therefore, in this case, the condition depends only on the conformal structure. Now $X$ is a w-Killing vector field if and only if

$$\mathcal{L}_X \left(g\mu_g^{w}\right) = (\mathcal{L}_X g) \mu_g^{w} + w g \mu_g^{w -1} \mathcal{L}_X \mu_g = 0.$$

Since $\mathcal{L}_X \mu_g = \operatorname{div}(X) \mu_g$ this is equivalent to

$$\mathcal{L}_X g = - w\operatorname{div}(X) g.$$

Taking traces of both sides, we conclude $2\mathop{\mathrm{div}}(X) = -w n \operatorname{div}(X)$. Hence for $w \ne -2/n$, necessarily $\operatorname{div}(X) = 0$ and a w-Killing vector field is just a normal Killing vector field whose flow preserves the metric. However, for $w = -2/n$, the flow of $X$ has to only preserve the conformal structure and is, by definition, a conformal Killing vector field.

== Equivalent formulations ==
The following are equivalent

1. $X$ is a conformal Killing vector field,
2. The (locally defined) flow of $X$ preserves the conformal structure,
3. $\mathcal{L}_X (g\mu_g^{-2/n}) = 0,$
4. $\mathcal{L}_X g = \frac{2}{n} \operatorname{div}(X) g,$
5. $\mathcal{L}_X g = \lambda g$ for some function $\lambda.$

The discussion above proves the equivalence of all but the seemingly more general last form. However, the last two forms are also equivalent: taking traces shows that necessarily $\lambda = (2/n) \operatorname{div}(X)$.

The last form makes it clear that any Killing vector is also a conformal Killing vector, with $\lambda \cong 0.$

== The conformal Killing equation ==
Using that $\mathcal{L}_X g = 2 \left(\nabla X^\flat \right)^{\mathrm{symm}}$ where $\nabla$ is the Levi Civita derivative of $g$ (aka covariant derivative), and $X^{\flat}=g(X,\cdot)$ is the dual 1 form of $X$ (aka associated covariant vector aka vector with lowered indices), and ${}^{\mathrm{symm}}$ is projection on the symmetric part, one can write the conformal Killing equation in abstract index notation as

$$\nabla_a X_b + \nabla_b X_a = \frac{2}{n}g_{ab}\nabla_{c}X^c.$$

Another index notation to write the conformal Killing equations is

$$X_{a;b}+X_{b;a} = \frac{2}{n}g_{ab} X^c{}_{;c}.$$

== Examples ==
=== Flat space ===
In $n$-dimensional flat space, that is Euclidean space or pseudo-Euclidean space, there exist globally flat coordinates in which we have a constant metric $g_{\mu\nu} = \eta_{\mu\nu}$ where in space with signature $(p,q)$, we have components $(\eta_{\mu\nu}) = \text{diag}(+1,\cdots,+1,-1,\cdots,-1)$. In these coordinates, the connection components vanish, so the covariant derivative is the coordinate derivative. The conformal Killing equation in flat space is
$$\partial_\mu X_\nu + \partial_\nu X_\mu = \frac{2}{n}\eta_{\mu\nu} \partial_\rho X^\rho.$$
The solutions to the flat space conformal Killing equation includes the solutions to the flat space Killing equation discussed in the article on Killing vector fields. These generate the Poincaré group of isometries of flat space. Considering the ansatz $X^\mu = M^{\mu\nu}x_\nu,$, we remove the antisymmetric part of $M^{\mu\nu}$ as this corresponds to known solutions, and we're looking for new solutions. Then $M^{\mu\nu}$ is symmetric. It follows that this is a dilatation, with $M^\mu_\nu = \lambda\delta^\mu_\nu$ for real $\lambda$, and corresponding Killing vector $X^\mu = \lambda x^\mu$.

From the general solution there are $n$ more generators, known as special conformal transformations, given by

$$X_\mu = c_{\mu\nu\rho}x^\nu x^\rho,$$

where the traceless part of $c_{\mu\nu\rho}$ over $\mu,\nu$ vanishes, hence can be parametrised by $c^\mu{}_{\mu\nu} = b_\nu$.

General solution to the conformal Killing equation (in more than two dimensions)

For convenience we rewrite the conformal Killing equation as
$$\partial_\mu X_\nu + \partial_\nu X_\mu = f(\mathbf{x})g_{\mu\nu}.$$
(By taking traces we can recover $f(\mathbf{x}) = \frac{2}{n}\partial_\rho X^\rho.$)

Applying an extra derivative, relabelling indices and taking a linear combination of the resulting equations gives
$$2\partial_\mu\partial_\nu X_\rho = \eta_{\mu\rho}\partial_\nu f + \eta_{\nu\rho} \partial_\mu f - \eta_{\mu\nu} \partial_\rho f.$$
Contracting on $\mu,\nu$ gives
$$2 \partial^2 X_\rho = (2 - n)\partial_\rho f.$$
A combination of derivatives of this and the original conformal Killing equation gives
$$(2-n)\partial_\mu\partial_\nu f = \eta_{\mu\nu} \partial^2 f,$$
and contracting gives
$$(n-1)\partial^2 f = 0.$$
Now focussing on the case $n \geq 3$, the two previous equations together show $\partial_\mu \partial_\nu f = 0$, so $f$ is at most linear in the coordinates. Substituting into an earlier equation gives that $\partial_\mu \partial_\nu X_\rho$ is constant, so $X_\mu$ is at most quadratic in coordinates, with general form
$$X_\mu = a_\mu + b_{\mu\nu}x^\nu + c_{\mu\nu\rho}x^\nu x^\rho.$$

Together, the $n$ translations, $n(n-1)/2$ Lorentz transformations, $1$ dilatation and $n$ special conformal transformations comprise the conformal algebra, which generate the conformal group of pseudo-Euclidean space.

== See also ==
- Affine vector field
- Conformal Killing tensor
- Curvature collineation
- Einstein manifold
- Homothetic vector field
- Invariant differential operator
- Killing vector field
- Matter collineation
- Spacetime symmetries
