= Constant curvature =

Concept in differential geometry

In mathematics, constant curvature is a concept from differential geometry. Here, curvature refers to the sectional curvature of a space (more precisely a differentiable manifold) and is a single number that determines its local geometry. The sectional curvature is said to be constant if it has the same value at every point and for every two-dimensional tangent plane at that point. For example, a sphere is a surface of constant positive curvature.

== Classification ==
The classifications here are based on the universal covering space. There may be more than one space that has the same universal covering space.

The Riemannian manifolds of constant curvature can be classified into the following three classes:

- Elliptic geometry – constant positive sectional curvature
- Euclidean geometry – constant vanishing sectional curvature
- Hyperbolic geometry – constant negative sectional curvature.

The Lorentzian manifolds of constant curvature can be classified into the following three classes:

- De Sitter space – constant positive sectional curvature
- Minkowski space (generalized to any dimension) – constant vanishing sectional curvature
- Anti-de Sitter space – constant negative sectional curvature.

The de Sitter and anti-de Sitter spaces of dimension 2 are the same (the sign of the curvature depends on which direction is referenced as "space-like").

For every signature, dimension and curvature, a similar classification exists.

== Properties ==
- Every space of constant curvature is locally symmetric, i.e. its curvature tensor is parallel $\nabla \mathrm{R}=0$.
- Every space of dimension $n$ of constant curvature is locally maximally symmetric, i.e. it has $\textstyle \frac{1}{2} n (n+1)$ local isometries.
- Conversely, there exists a similar but stronger statement: every maximally symmetric space, i.e. a space that has $\textstyle \frac{1}{2} n (n+1)$ (global) isometries, has constant curvature.
- (Killing–Hopf theorem) The universal cover of a Riemannian manifold of constant sectional curvature is one of the model spaces:
  - sphere (positive sectional curvature)
  - plane (zero sectional curvature)
  - hyperbolic manifold (negative sectional curvature)
- A space of constant curvature that is geodesically complete is called a space form. The study of space forms is intimately related to generalized crystallography (see the article Space form for more details).
- Two space forms are isomorphic if and only if they have the same dimension, their metrics possess the same signature and their sectional curvatures are equal.
