= Projective vector field =

A projective vector field (projective) is a smooth vector field on a semi Riemannian manifold (p.ex. spacetime) $M$ whose flow preserves the geodesic structure of $M$ without necessarily preserving the affine parameter of any geodesic. More intuitively, the flow of the projective maps geodesics smoothly into geodesics without preserving the affine parameter.

== Decomposition ==
In dealing with a vector field $X$ on a semi Riemannian manifold (p.ex. in general relativity), it is often useful to decompose the covariant derivative into its symmetric and skew-symmetric parts:

$$X_{a;b}=\frac{1}{2}h_{ab}+ F_{ab}$$

where

$$h_{ab}=(\mathcal{L}_X g)_{ab}=X_{a;b}+X_{b;a}$$

and

$$F_{ab}=\frac{1}{2}(X_{a;b}-X_{b;a})$$

Note that $X_a$ are the covariant components of $X$.

=== Equivalent conditions ===
Mathematically, the condition for a vector field $X$ to be projective is equivalent to the existence of a one-form $\psi$ satisfying

$$X_{a;bc}\, =R_{abcd}X^d+2g_{a(b}\psi_{c)}$$

which is equivalent to

$$h_{ab;c}\, =2g_{ab}\psi_c+g_{ac}\psi_b+g_{bc}\psi_a$$

The set of all global projective vector fields over a connected or compact manifold forms a finite-dimensional Lie algebra denoted by $P(M)$ (the projective algebra) and satisfies for connected manifolds the condition: $\dim P(M) \le n(n+2)$. Here a projective vector field is uniquely determined by specifying the values of $X$, $\nabla X$ and $\nabla \nabla X$ (equivalently, specifying $X$, $h$, $F$ and $\psi$) at any point of $M$. (For non-connected manifolds you need to specify these 3 in one point per connected component.) Projectives also satisfy the properties:

$$\mathcal{L}_X R^a{}_{bcd} = \delta ^a{}_d \psi_{b;c} - \delta ^a{}_c \psi_{b;d}$$
$$\mathcal{L}_X R_{ab}= -3 \psi_{a;b}$$

== Subalgebras ==
Several important special cases of projective vector fields can occur and they form Lie subalgebras of $P(M)$. These subalgebras are useful, for example, in classifying spacetimes in general relativity.

=== Affine algebra ===
Affine vector fields (affines) satisfy $\nabla h=0$ (equivalently, $\psi=0$) and hence every affine is a projective. Affines preserve the geodesic structure of the semi Riem. manifold (read spacetime) whilst also preserving the affine parameter. The set of all affines on $M$ forms a Lie subalgebra of $P(M)$ denoted by $A(M)$ (the affine algebra) and satisfies for connected M, $\dim A(M) \le n(n+1)$. An affine vector is uniquely determined by specifying the values of the vector field and its first covariant derivative (equivalently, specifying $X$, $h$ and $F$) at any point of $M$. Affines also preserve the Riemann, Ricci and Weyl tensors, i.e.

$\mathcal{L}_X R^a{}_{bcd}=0$, $\mathcal{L}_X R_{ab}=0$, $\mathcal{L}_X C^a{}_{bcd}=0$

=== Homothetic algebra ===
Homothetic vector fields (homotheties) preserve the metric up to a constant factor, i.e. $h = \mathcal{L}_X g = 2c g$. As $\nabla h=0$, every homothety is an affine and the set of all homotheties on $M$ forms a Lie subalgebra of $A(M)$ denoted by $H(M)$ (the homothetic algebra) and satisfies for connected M

$$\dim H(M) \le \frac{1}{2}n(n+1)+1$$.

A homothetic vector field is uniquely determined by specifying the values of the vector field and its first covariant derivative (equivalently, specifying $X$, $F$ and $c$) at any point of the manifold.

=== Killing algebra ===
Killing vector fields (Killings) preserve the metric, i.e. $h = \mathcal{L}_X g = 0$. Taking $c=0$ in the defining property of a homothety, it is seen that every Killing is a homothety (and hence an affine) and the set of all Killing vector fields on $M$ forms a Lie subalgebra of $H(M)$ denoted by $K(M)$ (the Killing algebra) and satisfies for connected M

$$\dim K(M) \le \frac{1}{2}n(n+1)$$.

A Killing vector field is uniquely determined by specifying the values of the vector field and its first covariant derivative (equivalently, specifying $X$ and $F$) at any point (for every connected component) of $M$.

== Applications ==
In general relativity, many spacetimes possess certain symmetries that can be characterised by vector fields on the spacetime. For example, Minkowski space ${\mathbb M}$ admits the maximal projective algebra, i.e. $\dim P({\mathbb M}) = 24$.

Many other applications of symmetry vector fields in general relativity may be found in Hall (2004) which also contains an extensive bibliography including many research papers in the field of symmetries in general relativity.
