= Robert Geroch =

American mathematical physicist (b. 1942)

- Born: 1 June 1942 (age 84)
- Known for: Geroch energy Geroch's splitting theorem Geroch group
- Scientific career
- Fields: Physics; Mathematics
- Workplaces: University of Chicago
- Doctoral advisor: John Archibald Wheeler
- Doctoral students: Abhay Ashtekar; Gary Horowitz; Basilis C. Xanthopoulos

Robert Geroch (born 1 June 1942 in Akron, Ohio) is an American theoretical physicist and professor at the University of Chicago. He has worked prominently on general relativity and mathematical physics and has promoted the use of category theory in mathematics and physics. He was the Ph.D. supervisor for Abhay Ashtekar, Basilis Xanthopoulos and Gary Horowitz. He also proved an important theorem in spin geometry. He received the Quantrell Award.

== Education ==
Geroch obtained his Ph.D. degree from Princeton University in 1967 under the supervision of John Archibald Wheeler, with a thesis on Singularities in the spacetime of general relativity: their definition, existence, and local characterization.

== Writings ==
=== Chapters ===
- Geroch, Robert (1977). Esposito, F. P.; Witten, L. (eds.). Asymptotic Structure of Space-Time. Boston, MA: Springer US. pp. 1–105. doi:10.1007/978-1-4684-2343-3_1. ISBN 978-1-4684-2345-7.
- Horowitz, G.T and Geroch, R.P. (1979) "Global structure of spacetimes", p. 212–293. In Hawking S.W. and Israel, W (eds): General Relativity: An Einstein Centenary Survey. Cambridge University Press 1979 (ISBN 9780521299282)

=== Articles ===
- Geroch, R. P. (1966-08-22). "Singularities in Closed Universes". Physical Review Letters. 17 (8): 445–447. Bibcode:1966PhRvL..17..445G. doi:10.1103/PhysRevLett.17.445. ISSN 0031-9007.
- Geroch, Robert P. (1967-04-01). "Topology in General Relativity". Journal of Mathematical Physics. 8 (4): 782–786. Bibcode:1967JMP.....8..782G. doi:10.1063/1.1705276. ISSN 0022-2488.
- Geroch, Robert (1968), "Spinor Structure of Space-Times in General Relativity. I", Journal of Mathematical Physics, 9 (11): 1739–1743, Bibcode:1968JMP.....9.1739G, doi:10.1063/1.1664507
- Geroch, Robert (1970-06-01). "Multipole Moments. I. Flat Space". Journal of Mathematical Physics. 11 (6): 1955–1961. Bibcode:1970JMP....11.1955G. doi:10.1063/1.1665348. ISSN 0022-2488.
- Geroch, Robert (1970-02-01). "Domain of Dependence". Journal of Mathematical Physics. 11 (2): 437–449. Bibcode:1970JMP....11..437G. doi:10.1063/1.1665157. ISSN 0022-2488.
- Geroch, R.P. (1971) "Space-time structure from a global viewpoint," Rend. Scu. Int. Fis. Enrico Fermi 47: 71-103(1971); in B.K.Sachs, ed., General Relativity and Cosmology (New York, Academic Press, 1971).
- Geroch, Robert (1971-06-01). "A Method for Generating Solutions of Einstein's Equations". Journal of Mathematical Physics. 12 (6): 918–924. Bibcode:1971JMP....12..918G. doi:10.1063/1.1665681. ISSN 0022-2488.
- Geroch, Robert (1972-03-01). "A Method for Generating New Solutions of Einstein's Equation. II". Journal of Mathematical Physics. 13 (3): 394–404. Bibcode:1972JMP....13..394G. doi:10.1063/1.1665990. ISSN 0022-2488.
- Geroch, Robert (1972). "Einstein algebras". Communications in Mathematical Physics. 26 (4): 271–275. Bibcode:1972CMaPh..26..271G. doi:10.1007/BF01645521. ISSN 0010-3616.
- Geroch, R. P.; Kronheimer, E. H.; Penrose, R. (1972-04-25). "Ideal points in space-time". Proceedings of the Royal Society of London. A. Mathematical and Physical Sciences. 327 (1571): 545–567. Bibcode:1972RSPSA.327..545G. doi:10.1098/rspa.1972.0062. ISSN 0080-4630.
- Ashtekar, A; Geroch, R (1974-10-01). "Quantum theory of gravitation". Reports on Progress in Physics. 37 (10): 1211–1256. Bibcode:1974RPPh...37.1211A. doi:10.1088/0034-4885/37/10/001. ISSN 0034-4885.

=== Books ===
- R. Geroch (1981). General Relativity from A to B. University of Chicago Press. ISBN 0-226-28863-3.
- R. Geroch (1985). Mathematical Physics (Lectures in Physics). University of Chicago Press. ISBN 0-226-28862-5.
- R. Geroch (2009). Perspectives in computation. University of Chicago Press. ISBN 978-0-226-28855-0.
- R. Geroch (2013). Geometrical Quantum Mechanics: 1974 Lecture Notes (Lecture Notes Series) (Volume 3). Minkowski Institute Press; 1 edition. ISBN 978-1927763049.

== Unpublished notes ==
- Course Notes, Problem Sets, and Short Topics, for Lecture courses at the University of Chicago, primarily in the 1970s.
- Suggestions For Giving Talks, Notes on giving scientific talks, 1973. Available at: arXiv:gr-qc/9703019

== See also ==
- Geroch energy
- Geroch group
- Geroch's splitting theorem
- GHP formalism
