= Arthur Komar =

American physicist (1931–2011)

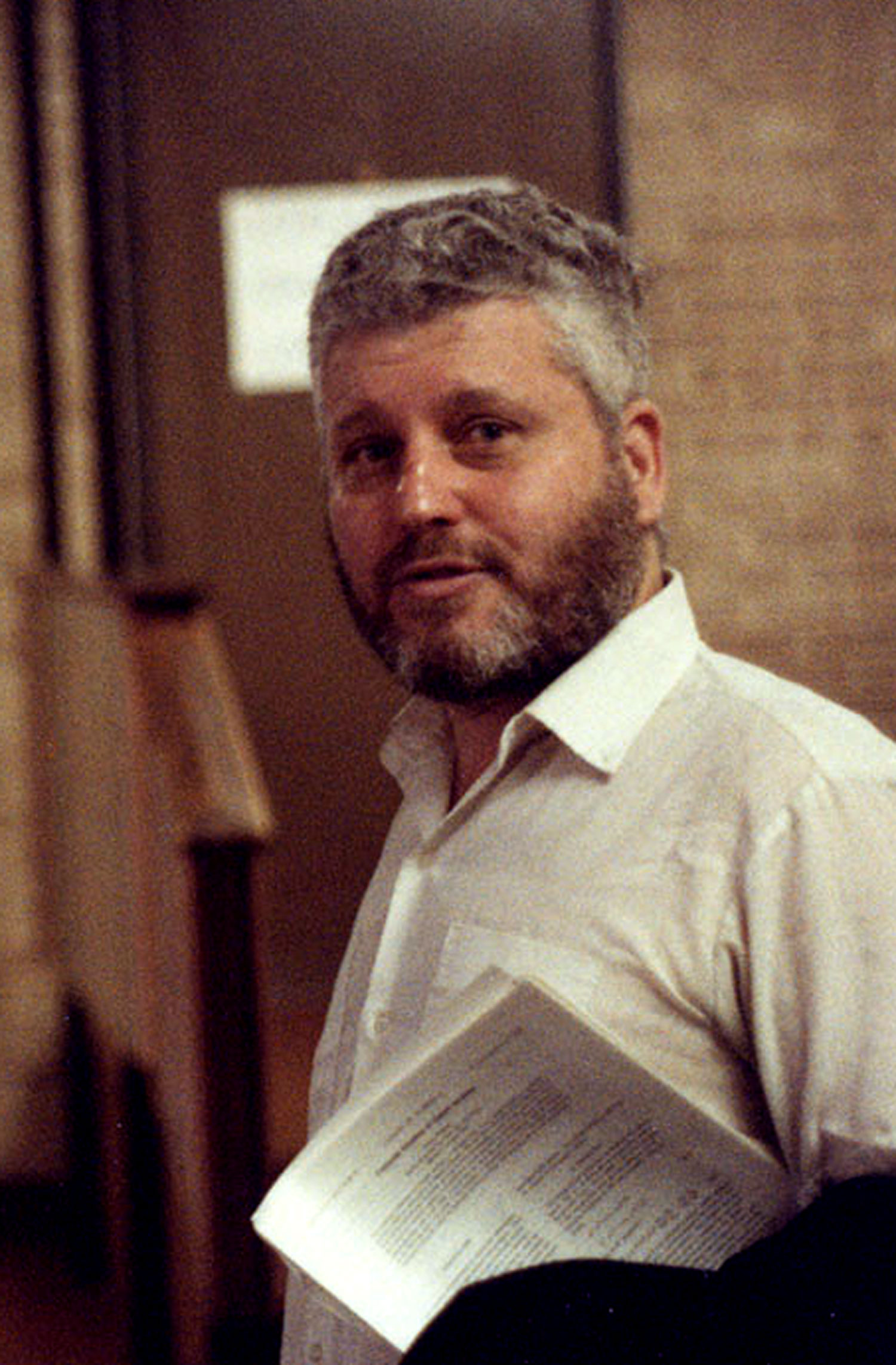
- Born: 26 March 1931
- Died: 3 June 2011 (aged 80)
- Education: Princeton University
- Known for: Komar superpotential Komar mass
- Scientific career
- Workplaces: Syracuse University; Yeshiva University

Arthur Baraway Komar (March 26, 1931 – June 3, 2011) known as Art Komar was an American theoretical physicist, specializing in general relativity and helping to develop the canonical approach to quantum gravity. Arthur Komar made a significant contribution to physics as an educator, research scientist, and administrator. He had wide interests in numerous other subjects, and his friends knew him as a Renaissance man. The terms Komar mass and Komar superpotential are named after him.

== Life and education ==
Arthur "Artie" Komar attended Midwood High School in Brooklyn, where he was a capable student and chose to specialize in physics before going on to study physics at Princeton on a Hibben scholarship in 1948. While there, he wrote for Nassau literary magazine, was a four-year member of the Whig-Clio senate, and was elected to the Phi Beta Kappa Society at the end of his junior year, graduating in 1952 and with an undergraduate thesis reviewing the classical electron. That year he married Dolly Rothziege, a German-born artist who was 18 years old at the time, and with whom he later had two children. Komar went on to do his PhD at Princeton under the direction of John Archibald Wheeler, which he received in 1956 for a thesis entitled, Some Consequences of Mach's Principle for General Relativity.

After graduating, Komar and his wife moved for one year to the Niels Bohr Institute at University of Copenhagen, where he was a Fellow of the American-Scandinavian Foundation. The family's first child was born in 1957, a son, and soon after they moved so Komar could join Syracuse University. He began as a postdoc, soon rising to the ranks of assistant professor and then associate professor. The Komars had their second child in 1962, and shortly left to return to New York City so that Komar could join the physics faculty of Yeshiva University as an associate professor in 1963, later becoming full professor. From 1969 until 1978 Komar was the dean of Yeshiva's Belfer Graduate School of Science. Komar became chair of the physics department in Yeshiva from 1978 to 1982 and chairman of the Division of Natural Science from 1983 to 1986. He also served as a physics program director at the National Science Foundation, during which time Komar awarded a quantum gravity grant to physicist and author Carlo Rovelli while the latter was at the University of Pittsburgh. Komar was a consultant for the LIGO project from 1991 to 1992.

In 1974 Arthur and Dolly were divorced. Dolly moved back to Syracuse, where she married an old family friend and Syracuse University physicist, Arnold Honig. Meanwhile, developmental psychologist at Syracuse University Alice Sterling Honig, who was Arnold Honig's ex-wife, became the long-term partner of Arthur Komar until he died. Komar retired in 1997 and moved back to Syracuse, where he died on 3 June 2011 at the age of 80.

== Research ==
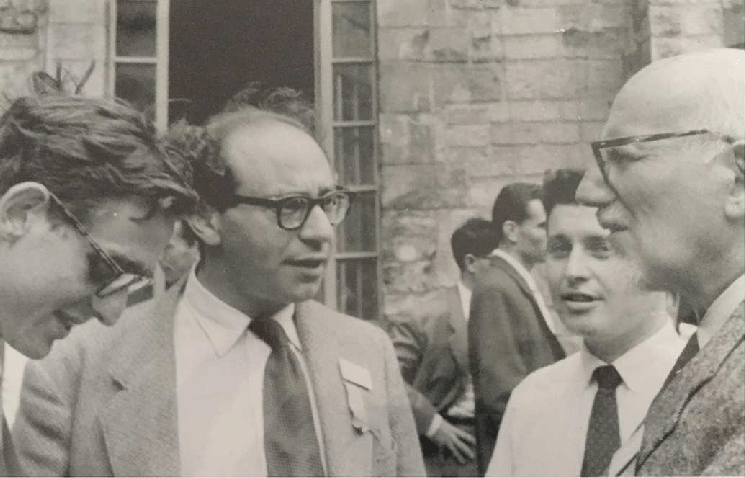
From left: Rainer Sachs, Ivor Robinson, Komar, John Lighton Synge, in 1962

Komar's interests in physics ranged over numerous fundamental and applied concepts, including conserved quantities, space and time, and thermodynamics. Notably he pursued the problem of observables in general relativity and in quantum theory.

It is said that John Wheeler arranged a tea-time visit for his class, which to Arthur's pleasure had the company of Albert Einstein. Throughout his scientific career, Arthur remained fond of Princeton.

Beginning in the late 1950s Komar developed a fruitful collaboration with Peter Bergmann, working together to help develop the foundations of canonical quantum gravity, and in particular the use of Hamilton-Jacobi theory to define a reduced phase space for general relativity with the diffeomorphism group as its gauge group in the 1960s and 1970s. This approach is notable for its use of Weyl curvature scalars to determine a time-dependent gauge fixing.

Komar also worked on the problem of invariants in general relativistic spacetimes, now known as Komar-invariants or Bergmann-Komar invariants.

Komar is also known for formulating the concept of Komar mass and Komar superpotential.

== Selected works ==
=== Physics ===
==== Quantum theory and relativistic theory ====
- A. B. Komar (1970). "The quantitative epistemological content of Bohr's Correspondence Principle". Synthese. 21 (1): 83–92. doi:10.1007/bf00414189. S2CID 46961397.

==== Conserved quantities and laws in general relativity ====
- Arthur Komar (1959). "Covariant Conservation Laws in General Relativity". Phys. Rev. 113 (3): 934. Bibcode:1959PhRv..113..934K. doi:10.1103/PhysRev.113.934.
- A. B. Komar (1963). "Positive-Definite Energy Density and Global Consequences for General Relativity". Phys. Rev. 129 (4): 1873. Bibcode:1963PhRv..129.1873K. doi:10.1103/PhysRev.129.1873.
- A. B. Komar (1962). "Asymptotic Covariant Conservation Laws for Gravitational Radiation". Phys. Rev. 127 (4): 1411. Bibcode:1962PhRv..127.1411K. doi:10.1103/PhysRev.127.1411.

==== Observables in general relativity ====
- A. B. Komar (1984). "Enlarged gauge symmetry of gravitation theory". Phys. Rev. D. 30 (2): 305–308. Bibcode:1984PhRvD..30..305K. doi:10.1103/PhysRevD.30.305.
- A. B. Komar (1981). "Relativistic action at a distance and quasiseparability". Phys. Rev. D. 24 (8): 2330–2331. Bibcode:1981PhRvD..24.2330K. doi:10.1103/PhysRevD.24.2330.

==== Singularities in general relativity ====
- Komar, A. B. (1956). "Necessity of Singularities in the Solution of the Field Equations of General Relativity". Physical Review. 104 (2): 544–546. Bibcode:1956PhRv..104..544K. doi:10.1103/PhysRev.104.544.

== See also ==
- History of general relativity

== Sources ==
- "Princeton Alumni Weekly". October 26, 2011.
- J. N. Goldberg. "Physics today".
- "Syracuse.com Obituaries".
