= Basilis C. Xanthopoulos =

Greek theoretical physicist (1951–1990)

Basilis Xanthopoulos
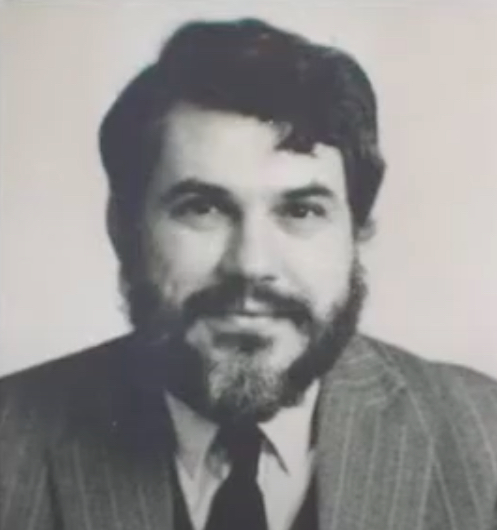
- Born: April 8, 1951; Drama, Greece
- Died: November 27, 1990 (aged 39); Heraklion, Greece
- Known for: Gravitational Waves
- Scientific career
- Fields: Mathematical Physics
- Institutions: University of Thessaloniki; University of Chicago; University of Crete
- Doctoral advisor: Robert Geroch

Basilis C. Xanthopoulos (also Vasilis; Greek: Βασίλης Κ. Ξανθόπουλος; 8 April 1951 – 27 November 1990) was a Greek theoretical physicist, well known in the field of general relativity for his contributions to the study of colliding plane waves.

== Early years ==
Basilis Xanthopoulos was born in Drama. He excelled in high school showing advanced analytic abilities in physics and mathematics. He was awarded the 1st prize in the national mathematics competition, organised by the Greek mathematical society in 1969 and at the same year he was admitted with the highest grade among all students in Greece to the Department of Mathematics of the University of Thessaloniki. Four years later he also graduated first in his class and after scoring at the top 1% in the GRE, he was admitted for graduate studies in Physics at the University of Chicago. He moved to Chicago in December 1974 and earned his Ph.D. on May 30, 1978, under the supervision of Prof. Robert Geroch. The title of his dissertation was "Exact vacuum solutions of Einsteins equation from linearized solutions". During this time, he commenced a close lifelong collaboration with Subrahmanyan Chandrasekhar, who was effectively his co-supervisor and became a close friend and life-long mentor. Chandrasekhar, having been awarded the Nobel prize in Physics in 1983, visited Crete several times in the mid to late 1980's to collaborate with Xanthopoulos, and actually mentions in 1991 in Current Science that "My association with Basilis is the most binding in all my sixty years of science".

== Academic career ==
Upon completing his PhD Xanthopoulos moved as a visiting assistant professor at the Department of Physics of Montana State University until June 1979 and continued as a postdoctoral researcher at Syracuse University. In December 1979 he returned, as a Chief Assistant, to the Department of Physics of the University of Thessaloniki. On November 29, 1982, he moved as a faculty to the newly established Department of Physics of the University of Crete, where he advanced through the ranks becoming full professor in 1987. He served as a Chairman of department from 1987 until his murder on the evening of November 27, 1990, shot together with his colleague Stephanos Pnevmatikos while giving a seminar by a 32-year-old disgruntled mentally unstable named Giorgos Petrodaskalakis (who later committed suicide).

== Scientific contributions ==
Xanthopoulos contributed in a number of areas of mathematical physics and general theory of relativity. In particular, he worked on:

- Asymptotic structure of spacetime. This is a research field in which he was influenced by the supervisor R. Geroch and his works (in collaboration with A. Ashtekar, C. Hoenselaers, W. Kinnerslay);
- Creation of "anomalies" in space-time by colliding gravitational waves. It was one of the two pillars of his collaboration mainly with Chandrashekhar, which models two gravitational plane waves which collide, interact nonlinearly, and create in the interaction zone a curved region of spacetime which is locally isometric to the Kerr vacuum. This is now called the 'Chandrasekhar–Xanthopoulos colliding plane wave model;
- Disorders of spacetime (mainly Reissner-Nordstrom). This is the second pillar of his collaboration with Chandrashekhar and his work has characterized the field. They were an important part of the book "The Mathematical Theory of Black Holes" by Chandrashekhar in 1983;
- Cosmic Strings. In the 80's Xanthopoulos also dealt with mathematical issues concerning the cosmic strings, concerning the period when he worked in Crete;
- Scalar fields, a very important topic in gravitational physics. Xanthopoulos contributed in this direction in collaboration with V. Ferrari, on the possibility of black holes to support the existence of scalar fields.

The complete list of his publications is available from NASA/ADS here, while his Google Scholar profile is available here.

== Recognition ==
The appreciation on the contributions of Basilis Xanthopoulos to science and education is reflected by a number of events in his memory:

- "Basilis Xanthopoulos - Stefanos Pnevmatikos" Award for Excellence in Academic Teaching, by the Foundation for Research and Technology - Hellas (FORTH), established in 1991 and awarded annually by the President of the Hellenic Republic.
- International "Xanthopoulos Award", also by the Foundation for Research and Technology - Hellas (FORTH), and awarded once every three years by the Society on General Relativity and Gravitation to a scientist under the age of 40 who has an "outstanding (preferably theoretical) contribution to the field of gravitational physics" .
- The "Basilis Xanthopoulos" Competition in Physics and Mathematics for high school students in the prefecture of Drama.
- In his honor, the amphitheater of the 1st General Lyceum of Drama was named "Basilis Xanthopoulos Amphitheater".
- In his honor, the lecture hall of the Observatory of the Aristotle University of Thessaloniki was named "Basilis Xanthopoulos Hall".
- In his honor, the amphitheater A of the Department of Physics of the University of Crete was named "Basilis Xanthopoulos - Stefanos Pnevmatikos Amphitheater".

On April 8, 2021, on the occasion of the 70 years since his birth, the Department of Physics of the University of Crete and the Institute of Astrophysics of FORTH made available online his personal archive in a dedicated web page.
