= Homothetic vector field =

Vector field

In physics, a homothetic vector field (sometimes homothetic collineation or homothety) is a projective vector field which satisfies the condition:

$$\mathcal{L}_X g_{ab}=2c g_{ab}$$

where c is a real constant. Homothetic vector fields find application in the study of singularities in general relativity. They can also be used to generate new solutions for Einstein equations by similarity reduction.

== See also ==
- Affine vector field
- Conformal Killing vector field
- Curvature collineation
- Killing vector field
- Matter collineation
- Spacetime symmetries
