= Geroch energy =

Definition of mass in general relativity

In general relativity, the Geroch energy (also called the Geroch mass) is a proposed quasi-local mass associated with a closed two-dimensional surface embedded in a three-dimensional Riemannian manifold. It was introduced by Robert Geroch as a geometric quantity intended to measure the mass contained within a finite region, using only the geometry of the bounding surface. A key feature of the Geroch energy is its monotonicity under outward deformations of surfaces that later became formalized as the inverse mean curvature flow, a property that was crucial in the proof of the Penrose inequality in the time-symmetric case.

== Definition ==
Let $\Sigma$ be a smooth, closed surface embedded in a three-dimensional Riemannian manifold $(M,g)$. Let $H$ denote the mean curvature of $\Sigma$ with respect to the outward-pointing unit normal vector, and let $|\Sigma|$ denote its area. The Geroch energy of $\Sigma$ is defined by

$$E_G(\Sigma) = \sqrt{\frac{|\Sigma|}{16\pi}} \left( 1 - \frac{1}{16\pi} \int_\Sigma H^2 \, d\mu \right),$$

where $d\mu$ is the area element induced by the metric $g$ on $\Sigma$.

The Geroch energy coincides with the Hawking energy in the time-symmetric case, that is, when the extrinsic curvature of the ambient spacetime hypersurface vanishes. In this sense, the Geroch energy can be viewed as the restriction of the Hawking energy to purely Riemannian initial data. For general initial data sets, the Geroch energy is bounded above by the Hawking energy evaluated on the same surface, reflecting the fact that the latter incorporates additional spacetime information through the extrinsic curvature.

In addition to its monotonicity properties, the Geroch energy also satisfies positivity and rigidity results under suitable geometric assumptions; these properties are discussed in greater detail in the context of the more general Hawking energy.

== See also ==
- Mass in general relativity
- Robert Geroch
