= Komar mass =

Concept of mass used in general relativity

The Komar mass of a system is one of several formal concepts of mass that are used in general relativity. The Komar mass can be defined in any stationary spacetime, which is a spacetime in which all the metric components can be written so that they are independent of time. Alternatively, a stationary spacetime can be defined as a spacetime which possesses a timelike Killing vector field. It is named after Arthur Komar who developed the concept in 1962.

The following discussion is an expanded and simplified version of the motivational treatment in Wald (1984, p. 288).

== Motivation ==
Consider the Schwarzschild metric. Using the Schwarzschild basis, a frame field for the Schwarzschild metric, one can find that the radial acceleration required to hold a test mass stationary at a Schwarzschild coordinate of r is:

$$a^\hat{r} = \frac{m}{r^2 \sqrt{1-\frac{2m}{r c^2}}}$$

Because the metric is static, there is a well-defined meaning to "holding a particle stationary".

Interpreting this acceleration as being due to a "gravitational force", we can then compute the integral of normal acceleration multiplied by area to get a "Gauss law" integral of:

$$\frac{4 \pi m}{\sqrt{1 - \frac{2m}{r c^2}}}$$

While this approaches a constant as r approaches infinity, it is not a constant independent of r. We are therefore motivated to introduce a correction factor to make the above integral independent of the radius r of the enclosing shell. For the Schwarzschild metric, this correction factor is just $\sqrt{g_{tt}}$, the "red-shift" or "time dilation" factor at distance r. One may also view this factor as "correcting" the local force to the "force at infinity", the force that an observer at infinity would need to apply through a string to hold the particle stationary.

To proceed further, we will write down a line element for a static metric.

$$ds^2 = g_{tt} \, dt^2 + \mathrm{quadratic\ form}(dx, \, dy, \, dz)$$

where $g_{tt}$ and the quadratic form are functions only of the spatial coordinates x, y, z and are not functions of time. In spite of our choices of variable names, it should not be assumed that our coordinate system is Cartesian. The fact that none of the metric coefficients are functions of time makes the metric stationary: the additional fact that there are no "cross terms" involving both time and space components (such as $dx dt$) make it static.

Because of the simplifying assumption that some of the metric coefficients are zero, some of our results in this motivational treatment will not be as general as they could be.

In flat space-time, the proper acceleration required to hold station is $du/d \tau$, where u is the 4-velocity of our hovering particle and $\tau$ is the proper time. In curved space-time, we must take the covariant derivative. Thus we compute the acceleration vector as:

$$a^b = \nabla_u u^b = u^c \nabla_c u^b$$
$$a_b = u^c \nabla_c u_b$$

where $u^b$ is a unit time-like vector such that $u^b u_b = -1.$

The component of the acceleration vector normal to the surface is

$$a_{\mathrm{norm}}= N^b a_b$$

where N^{b} is a unit vector normal to the surface.

In a Schwarzschild coordinate system, for example, we find that

$$N^b a_b = \frac{ \frac{\partial g_{tt}}{\partial r} c^2 }{2 g_{tt} \sqrt{g_{rr}}} = \frac{m}{r^2 \sqrt{1-\frac{2m}{rc^2}}}$$

as expected - we have simply re-derived the previous results presented in a frame-field in a coordinate basis.

We define

$$a_\inf = \sqrt{g_{tt}} \, a$$

so that in our Schwarzschild example: $N^b a_{\inf \, b} = m/r^2.$

We can, if we desire, derive the accelerations $a_b$ and the adjusted "acceleration at infinity" $a_{\inf \, b}$ from a scalar potential Z, though there is not necessarily any particular advantage in doing so.

$$a_b = \nabla_b Z_1 \qquad Z_1 = \ln{g_{tt}}$$
$$a_{\inf \, b} = \nabla_b Z_2 \qquad Z_2 = \sqrt{g_{tt}}$$

We will demonstrate that integrating the normal component of the "acceleration at infinity" $a_\inf$ over a bounding surface will give us a quantity that does not depend on the shape of the enclosing sphere, so that we can calculate the mass enclosed by a sphere by the integral

$$m = -\frac{1}{4 \pi} \int_A N^b a_{\inf \, b} \; dA$$

To make this demonstration, we need to express this surface integral as a volume integral. In flat space-time, we would use Stokes theorem and integrate $-\nabla \cdot a_\inf$ over the volume. In curved space-time, this approach needs to be modified slightly.

Using the formulas for electromagnetism in curved space-time as a guide, we write instead.

$$F_{ab} = a_{\inf \, a} \,u_b - a_{\inf \, b} \,u_a$$

where F plays a role similar to the "Faraday tensor", in that $a_{\inf \, a} = F_{ab} u^b$ We can then find the value of "gravitational charge", i.e. mass, by evaluating $\nabla^a F_{ab} u^b$ and integrating it over the volume of our sphere.

An alternate approach would be to use differential forms, but the approach above is computationally more convenient as well as not requiring the reader to understand differential forms.

A lengthy, but straightforward (with computer algebra) calculation from our assumed line element shows us that

$$-u^b \nabla^a F_{ab} =  \sqrt{g_{tt}} R_{00} u^a u^b = \sqrt{g_{tt}} R_{ab} u^a u^b$$

Thus we can write

$$m = \frac {\sqrt{g_{tt}}} {4 \pi} \int_V R_{ab} u^a u^b$$

In any vacuum region of space-time, all components of the Ricci tensor must be zero. This demonstrates that enclosing any amount of vacuum will not change our volume integral. It also means that our volume integral will be constant for any enclosing surface, as long as we enclose all of the gravitating mass inside our surface. Because Stokes theorem guarantees that our surface integral is equal to the above volume integral, our surface integral will also be independent of the enclosing surface as long as the surface encloses all of the gravitating mass.

By using Einstein's field equations

$$G^u{}_v = R^u{}_v - \frac{1}{2} R I^u{}_v = 8 \pi T^u{}_v$$

letting u=v and summing, we can show that $R = -8\pi T.$

This allows us to rewrite our mass formula as a volume integral of the stress–energy tensor.

$$m = \int_V \sqrt{g_{tt}} \left( 2 T_{ab} - T g_{ab} \right) u^a u^b dV$$

where

- V is the volume being integrated over;
- T_{ab} is the stress–energy tensor;
- u^{a} is a unit time-like vector such that u^{a} u_{a} = -1.

== As a volume integral ==
To make the formula for Komar mass work for a general stationary metric, regardless of the choice of coordinates, it must be modified slightly. We will present the applicable result from Wald (1984, eq. 11.2.10) without a formal proof.

$$m =  \int_V \left( 2 T_{ab} - T g_{ab} \right) u^a \xi^b dV,$$

where

- V is the volume being integrated over
- T_{ab} is the Stress–energy tensor;
- u^{a} is a unit time-like vector such that u^{a} u_{a} = -1;
- $\xi^b$ is a Killing vector, which expresses the time-translation symmetry of any stationary metric. The Killing vector is normalized so that it has a unit length at infinity, i.e. so that $\xi^a \xi_a = -1$ at infinity.

Note that $\xi^b$ replaces $\sqrt{g_{tt}} u^b\,$ in our motivational result.

If none of the metric coefficients $g_{ab}$ are functions of time, $\xi^a = (1, 0, 0, 0).$

While it is not necessary to choose coordinates for a stationary space-time such that the metric coefficients are independent of time, it is often convenient.

When we chose such coordinates, the time-like Killing vector for our system $\xi^a$ becomes a scalar multiple of a unit coordinate-time vector $u^a,$ i.e. $\xi^a = K u^a.$ When this is the case, we can rewrite our formula as

$$m = \int_V \left(2T_{00} - T g_{00} \right) K dV$$

Because $u^a$ is by definition a unit vector, K is just the length of $\xi^b$, i.e. K = $\sqrt{-\xi^a\xi_a}$.

Evaluating the "red-shift" factor K based on our knowledge of the components of $\xi^a$, we can see that K = $\sqrt{g_{tt}}$.

If we chose our spatial coordinates so that we have a locally Minkowskian metric $g_{ab} = \eta_{ab}$ we know that

$$g_{00}=-1, T = -T_{00}+ T_{11}+T_{22}+T_{33}$$

With these coordinate choices, we can write our Komar integral as

$$m = \int_V \sqrt{-\xi^a \xi_a} \left( T_{00}+T_{11}+T_{22}+T_{33} \right) dV$$

While we can't choose a coordinate system to make a curved space-time globally Minkowskian, the above formula provides some insight into the meaning of the Komar mass formula. Essentially, both energy and pressure contribute to the Komar mass. Furthermore, the contribution of local energy and mass to the system mass is multiplied by the local "red shift" factor $K = \sqrt{g_{tt}} = \sqrt{-\xi^a \xi_a}$

== As a surface integral ==
We also wish to give the general result for expressing the Komar mass as a surface integral.

The formula for the Komar mass in terms of the metric and its Killing vector is

$$m = - \frac{1}{8 \pi} \int_S \epsilon_{abcd} \nabla^c \xi^d$$

where $\epsilon_{abcd}$ are the Levi-civita symbols and $\xi^d$ is the Killing vector of our stationary metric, normalized so that $\xi^a \xi_a = -1$ at infinity.

The surface integral above is interpreted as the "natural" integral of a two form over a manifold.

As mentioned previously, if none of the metric coefficients $g_{ab}$ are functions of time, $\xi^a = \left( 1, 0, 0, 0 \right)$

== See also ==
- Komar superpotential
- Mass in general relativity
