= Ehlers group =

Physics concept

In mathematical physics, the Ehlers group, named after Jürgen Ehlers, is a finite-dimensional transformation group of stationary vacuum spacetimes which maps solutions of Einstein's field equations to other solutions. It has since found a number of applications, from use as a tool in the discovery of previously unknown solutions to a proof that solutions in the stationary axisymmetric case form an integrable system.

== See also ==
- Geroch group
- Bondi–Metzner–Sachs group
- Spacetime symmetries
