= Komar superpotential =

Hilbert–Einstein Lagrangian

In general relativity, the Komar superpotential, named after Arthur Komar who wrote about it in 1952, corresponding to the invariance of the Hilbert–Einstein Lagrangian $\mathcal{L}_\mathrm{G} = {1 \over 2\kappa} R \sqrt{-g} \, \mathrm{d}^4x$, is the tensor density:

$$U^{\alpha\beta}({\mathcal{L}_\mathrm{G}},\xi) ={\sqrt{-g}\over{\kappa}}\nabla^{[\beta}\xi^{\alpha]}
={\sqrt{-g}\over{2\kappa}}
(g^{\beta\sigma} \nabla_{\sigma}\xi^{\alpha} - g^{\alpha\sigma} \nabla_{\sigma}\xi^{\beta})
\, ,$$

associated with a vector field $\xi=\xi^{\rho}\partial_{\rho}$, and where $\nabla_{\sigma}$ denotes covariant derivative with respect to the Levi-Civita connection.

The Komar two-form:

$$\mathcal{U}({\mathcal{L}_\mathrm{G}},\xi) ={1 \over 2}U^{\alpha\beta}({\mathcal{L}_\mathrm{G}},\xi)
\mathrm{d}x_{\alpha\beta}=
{1\over{2\kappa}}\nabla^{[\beta}\xi^{\alpha]}\sqrt{-g}\,\mathrm{d}x_{\alpha\beta}
\, ,$$

where $\mathrm{d}x_{\alpha\beta}= \iota_{\partial{\alpha}}\mathrm{d}x_{\beta}= \iota_{\partial{\alpha}}\iota_{\partial{\beta}}\mathrm{d}^4x$ denotes interior product, generalizes to an arbitrary vector field $\xi$ the so-called above Komar superpotential, which was originally derived for timelike Killing vector fields.

Komar superpotential is affected by the anomalous factor problem: In fact, when computed, for example, on the Kerr–Newman solution, produces the correct angular momentum, but just one-half of the expected mass.

== See also ==
- Superpotential
- Einstein–Hilbert action
- Komar mass
- Tensor calculus
- Christoffel symbols
- Riemann curvature tensor
