= Hawking energy =

Proposed quasi-local mass in general relativity

Hawking energy (also called the Hawking mass) is a proposed quasi-local mass in general relativity associated with a closed spacelike 2-surface in spacetime. It was introduced by Stephen Hawking in 1968 as a simple geometric quantity intended to measure the mass or energy contained within a finite region, using only geometric data defined on the bounding surface rather than at infinity.

In general relativity, a quasi-local energy aims to assign an energy (or mass) to a finite spacetime region bounded by a closed surface. Unlike global notions such as the ADM mass, quasi-local quantities depend on the geometry of the chosen surface and generally require additional conditions to exhibit physically desirable properties.

== Definition ==
Let $\Sigma$ be a smooth closed spacelike 2-surface in a four-dimensional spacetime. At each point of $\Sigma$, there exist two future-directed null vector fields orthogonal to the surface, one outgoing and one ingoing. The corresponding null expansions $\theta_+$ and $\theta_-$ measure the divergence of these families of null geodesics as they emanate orthogonally from $\Sigma$. The null vector fields are chosen so that their inner product satisfies $\langle \ell_+, \ell_- \rangle = -2$, which fixes the normalization of the null expansions. With this convention, the Hawking energy is defined by

$$E_H(\Sigma)=\sqrt{\frac{|\Sigma|}{16\pi}}\left(1+\frac{1}{16\pi}\int_\Sigma \theta_+\theta_-\, d\mu\right),$$

where $|\Sigma|$ denotes the area of $\Sigma$ and $d\mu$ is its induced area measure.

=== Physical interpretation ===
The null expansions $\theta_+$ and $\theta_-$ measure the divergence of outgoing and ingoing families of light rays orthogonal to the surface $\Sigma$. Their product therefore encodes how bundles of light rays are focused or defocused by the spacetime geometry. From this perspective, the Hawking energy can be interpreted as a measure of the gravitational focusing of light caused by the matter content and curvature enclosed by $\Sigma$.

=== Expression in a spacelike hypersurface ===
If $\Sigma$ lies in a spacelike hypersurface represented by an initial data set $(M,g,k)$, where $(M,g)$ is a three-dimensional Riemannian manifold with metric $g$ and $k$ is the second fundamental form of $M$ as embedded in the ambient spacetime, the product of null expansions can be expressed in terms of the geometry of $\Sigma$. In this setting, it can be written using the mean curvature $H$ of $\Sigma\subset (M,g)$ (the trace of the second fundamental form of $\Sigma$ in $(M,g)$) and the trace $P=\mathrm{tr}_\Sigma k$ of $k$ restricted to $\Sigma$. In this case, the Hawking energy takes the form

$$E_H(\Sigma)=\sqrt{\frac{|\Sigma|}{16\pi}}\left(1-\frac{1}{16\pi}\int_\Sigma (H^2-P^2)\, d\mu\right).$$

This formulation is commonly used in mathematical relativity. In the special case of a time-symmetric initial data set, when $k=0$, the expression reduces to a Willmore-type functional of the surface and coincides with the Geroch energy, a quasi-local mass defined purely in terms of the Riemannian geometry of the hypersurface. In this sense, the Geroch energy can be viewed as a special case of the Hawking energy, and for general initial data sets, it is bounded above by the Hawking energy evaluated on the same surface.

== Properties and limitations ==
Despite its limitations, including the fact that it is not positive or monotonic in general, the Hawking energy has played an important role in both mathematical and physical aspects of general relativity. It has been extensively studied and used in the analysis of geometric inequalities, black hole physics, and the behavior of gravitational fields under geometric flows, and it serves as a foundational example in the development of other quasi-local mass definitions.

=== Positivity ===
The Hawking energy is not positive in general. A simple example is provided by Euclidean space: when evaluated on closed surfaces in flat three-dimensional space, the Hawking energy is non-positive and vanishes only for round spheres. In this sense, generic surfaces in flat space have strictly negative Hawking energy.

Nevertheless, the Hawking energy is known to be non-negative for certain special classes of surfaces under additional geometric and physical assumptions. In particular, consider a spacelike hypersurface for which the extrinsic curvature vanishes (a time-symmetric initial data set). In this case, the dominant energy condition reduces to the requirement that the underlying Riemannian manifold has non-negative scalar curvature. Under these assumptions, the Hawking energy is non-negative on stable constant mean curvature surfaces and on area-constrained Willmore surfaces, that is, on critical points of the Willmore functional under an area constraint.. In more general (non time-symmetric) initial data sets, significantly fewer positivity results are known.

=== Rigidity ===
In the context of quasi-local mass definitions, a rigidity result typically refers to the expectation that if the quasi-local energy of a surface vanishes, then the geometry enclosed by the surface must be flat, or correspond to a region of Minkowski spacetime. In this sense, rigidity results are meant to identify situations in which vanishing quasi-local energy implies the absence of gravitational fields.

For the Hawking energy, rigidity results are known only in very restricted settings. In particular, consider a time-symmetric initial data set satisfying the dominant energy condition, so that the underlying Riemannian manifold has non-negative scalar curvature. In this setting, if the Hawking energy vanishes on an almost round constant mean curvature surface, then the region enclosed by the surface is isometric to a Euclidean ball.

Beyond this case, no general rigidity results are currently known for the Hawking energy, particularly in non time-symmetric initial data sets or without additional geometric assumptions.

=== Monotonicity ===
In general, the Hawking energy does not satisfy a monotonicity property under arbitrary deformations of a surface. For generic families of surfaces in a spacetime or initial data set, the Hawking energy may increase or decrease, reflecting its dependence on the detailed geometry of the surface.

A canonical exact example illustrating the expected behavior of a quasi-local mass is provided by the Schwarzschild spacetime. In this case, the Hawking energy of any round sphere centered at the singularity coincides exactly with the mass parameter of the Schwarzschild solution, and is therefore constant along the natural foliation by coordinate spheres.

Nevertheless, the Hawking energy exhibits important monotonicity properties in several geometrically distinguished settings. One such setting arises in spacetime along null hypersurfaces. When evaluated on suitable foliations of a null cone by surfaces of constant null expansion, the Hawking energy is non-decreasing along the outgoing null direction. This monotonicity property already appears in Hawking’s original work and is closely related to the focusing of null geodesics.

In the case of a time-symmetric initial data set with non-negative scalar curvature, the Hawking energy is monotonic along the Inverse mean curvature flow. More precisely, if a family of connected surfaces evolves outward with normal velocity equal to the inverse of their mean curvature, then the Hawking energy is non-decreasing along the flow.

Concretely, the inverse mean curvature flow is defined by the evolution equation

$$\frac{dx}{dt} = \frac{1}{H}\,\nu,$$

where $H$ denotes the mean curvature of the evolving surface and $\nu$ is the outward-pointing unit normal vector. Along this flow, regions of smaller mean curvature expand more rapidly, and the Hawking energy is monotonic in the outward direction.

This monotonicity property played a central role in the proof of the Riemannian Penrose inequality by Huisken and Ilmanen, where the Hawking energy provides a geometric quantity interpolating between the area of an apparent horizon and the total mass of the spacetime.

Further monotonicity results are known in related geometric settings. In asymptotically flat, time-symmetric initial data sets with non-negative scalar curvature, the Hawking energy is monotonic along foliations by area-constrained Willmore surfaces.

=== Large- and small-sphere limits ===
An important consistency requirement for any quasi-local energy is that it reproduces the appropriate global notions of mass in suitable limiting regimes. The Hawking energy satisfies this requirement in both spacelike and null settings.

In a time-symmetric, asymptotically flat initial data set with non-negative scalar curvature, the Hawking energy evaluated on large surfaces approaching spatial infinity converges to the ADM mass. This convergence holds when the surfaces are chosen as large coordinate spheres, as well as for geometrically distinguished families such as constant mean curvature spheres or area-constrained Willmore surfaces, provided these surfaces become asymptotically round at infinity.

In a spacetime setting, when the Hawking energy is evaluated on suitable families of surfaces approaching null infinity along outgoing null hypersurfaces, it converges to the Bondi mass. In this sense, the Hawking energy interpolates between quasi-local geometric information and the standard notions of total mass defined at infinity.

The Hawking energy also admits a well-defined small-sphere limit. When evaluated on a family of small spherical cross-sections of a null cone shrinking to a point, the Hawking energy captures local information about the spacetime geometry near that point. The leading-order behavior of the Hawking energy is determined by the local curvature and matter content of the spacetime, providing a quasi-local measure of gravitational energy in the small-sphere regime.

== See also ==
- Mass in general relativity
