= Bettye Caldwell =

American educator and university teacher (1924–2016)

- Born: December 24, 1924; Smithville, Texas
- Died: April 16, 2016 (aged 91); Little Rock, Arkansas
- Occupation: Professor of Education
- Known for: SRCD Award for Distinguished Contributions to Public Policy for Children
- Spouse: Fred Caldwell
- Children: 2

Academic background
- Education: Baylor University; University of Iowa; Washington University in St. Louis

Academic work
- Discipline: Psychology
- Notable ideas: Head Start

Bettye McDonald Caldwell (December 24, 1924 – April 17, 2016) was an American educator and academic who influenced the development of Head Start. She was the 1993 recipient of the Society for Research in Child Development's Award for Distinguished Contributions to Public Policy for Children.

== Biography ==
Caldwell was born in Smithville, Texas, to Thomas and Juanita McDonald. Her family was poor, as her father was a railroad engineer who lost his job when Caldwell was young. After graduating first in her high school class, Caldwell attended Baylor University, where she was a psychology and speech major. She earned a master's degree at the University of Iowa and a doctorate in psychology at Washington University in St. Louis. After graduate school, Caldwell was on the faculty or staff of several universities, including Northwestern University, Washington University, Syracuse University and SUNY Upstate.

While at Syracuse, Caldwell worked with pediatrician Julius Richmond on child development studies. Finding that poor children trailed off developmentally after the age of one, they created a day care center for children six months to five years of age. As the first infant group day care, the center required a waiver from the state. Caldwell felt that an emphasis on early childhood education could help to "level the playing field" for poor children before they started kindergarten. In 1964, Caldwell and Richmond's work led to the establishment of the Head Start project under Lyndon B. Johnson. Richmond was the first director of the project.

In the late 1960s, Caldwell moved to Arkansas. Working on the faculty of the University of Arkansas in Fayetteville, she established the Kramer Project, an initiative establishing a day care center associated with a Little Rock elementary school. Caldwell joined the faculty of the University of Arkansas at Little Rock in 1974. The school made her Donaghey Distinguished Professor in 1978, the same year that she was one of Ladies' Home Journal's 10 Women of the Year. She was named to the faculty of the University of Arkansas for Medical Sciences in 1993.

She and her husband, Fred Caldwell, had two children. Fred Caldwell died in 2004. Bettye died in April 2016.
