= Komar, Altai Krai =

Komar Комар
- Selo
- Location within Altai Krai Location within Russia
- Coordinates: 51°42′N 85°23′E
- Country: Russia
- Region: Altai Krai
- District: Altaysky District
- Time zone: UTC+7:00

Komar (Russian: Комар) is a rural locality (a selo) in Belovsky Selsoviet, Altaysky District, Altai Krai, Russia. The population was 193 as of 2013. There are 5 streets.

== Geography ==
Komar is located 30 km south of Altayskoye (the district's administrative centre) by road. Basargino is the nearest rural locality.
