= Wilhelm Killing =

German mathematician (1847–1923)

- Born: Wilhelm Karl Joseph Killing; 10 May 1847; Burbach near Siegen, Siegerland, Arnsberg, Province of Westphalia, Kingdom of Prussia
- Died: 11 February 1923 (aged 75); Münster, Münster District, Province of Westphalia, Free State of Prussia, Weimar Republic
- Known for: Lie algebras, Lie groups, and non-Euclidean geometry
- Spouse: Anna Commer
- Awards: Lobachevsky Prize (1900)
- Scientific career
- Fields: Mathematics
- Doctoral advisor: Karl Weierstrass; Ernst Kummer

Wilhelm Karl Joseph Killing (10 May 1847 – 11 February 1923) was a German mathematician who made important contributions to the theories of Lie algebras, Lie groups, and non-Euclidean geometry.

== Life ==
Killing studied at the University of Münster and later wrote his dissertation under Karl Weierstrass and Ernst Kummer at Berlin in 1872. He taught in gymnasia (secondary schools) from 1868 to 1872. In 1875, he married Anna Commer, who was the daughter of a music lecturer. He became a professor at the seminary college Collegium Hosianum in Braunsberg (now Braniewo). He took holy orders in order to take his teaching position. He became rector of the college and chair of the town council. As a professor and administrator, Killing was widely liked and respected. Finally, in 1892 he became a professor at the University of Münster.

In 1886, Killing and his wife entered the Third Order of Franciscans.

== Work ==
In 1878 Killing wrote on space forms in terms of non-Euclidean geometry in Crelle's Journal, which he further developed in 1880 as well as in 1885. Recounting lectures of Weierstrass, he there introduced the hyperboloid model of hyperbolic geometry described by Weierstrass coordinates. He is also credited with formulating transformations mathematically equivalent to Lorentz transformations in n dimensions in 1885.

Killing invented Lie algebras independently of Sophus Lie around 1880. Killing's university library did not contain the Scandinavian journal in which Lie's article appeared. (Lie later was scornful of Killing, perhaps out of competitive spirit and claimed that all that was valid had already been proven by Lie and all that was invalid was added by Killing.) In fact Killing's work was less rigorous logically than Lie's, but Killing had much grander goals in terms of classification of groups, and made a number of unproven conjectures that turned out to be true. Because Killing's goals were so high, he was excessively modest about his own achievement.

From 1888 to 1890, Killing essentially classified the complex finite-dimensional simple Lie algebras, as a requisite step of classifying Lie groups, inventing the notions of a Cartan subalgebra and the Cartan matrix. He thus arrived at the conclusion that, basically, the only simple Lie algebras were those associated to the linear, orthogonal, and symplectic groups, apart from a small number of isolated exceptions. Élie Cartan's 1894 dissertation was essentially a rigorous rewriting of Killing's paper. Killing also introduced the notion of a root system. He discovered the exceptional Lie algebra g_{2} in 1887; his root system classification showed up all the exceptional cases, but concrete constructions came later.

As A. J. Coleman says, "He exhibited the characteristic equation of the Weyl group when Weyl was 3 years old and listed the orders of the Coxeter transformation 19 years before Coxeter was born."

== Selected works ==
Work on non-Euclidean geometry

- Killing, W. (1878) [1877]. "Ueber zwei Raumformen mit constanter positiver Krümmung". Journal für die reine und angewandte Mathematik. 86: 72–83.
- Killing, W. (1880) [1879]. "Die Rechnung in den Nicht-Euklidischen Raumformen". Journal für die reine und angewandte Mathematik. 89: 265–287.
- Killing, W. (1885) [1884]. "Die Mechanik in den Nicht-Euklidischen Raumformen". Journal für die reine und angewandte Mathematik. 98: 1–48.
- Killing, W. (1885). Die nicht-euklidischen Raumformen. Leipzig: Teubner.
- Killing, W. (1891). "Ueber die Clifford-Klein'schen Raumformen". Mathematische Annalen. 39 (2): 257–278. doi:10.1007/bf01206655. S2CID 119473479.
- Killing, W. (1892). "Ueber die Grundlagen der Geometrie". Journal für die reine und angewandte Mathematik. 109: 121–186.
- Killing, W. (1893). "Zur projectiven Geometrie". Mathematische Annalen. 43 (4): 569–590. doi:10.1007/bf01446454. S2CID 121748880.
- Killing, W. (1893). Einführung in die Grundlagen der Geometrie I. Paderborn: Schöningh.
- Killing, W. (1898) [1897]. Einführung in die Grundlagen der Geometrie II. Paderborn: Schöningh.

Work on transformation groupsa

- Killing, W. (1888). "Die Zusammensetzung der stetigen endlichen Transformationsgruppen". Mathematische Annalen. 31 (2): 252–290. doi:10.1007/bf01211904. S2CID 120501356.
- Killing, W. (1889). "Die Zusammensetzung der stetigen endlichen Transformationsgruppen. Zweiter Theil". Mathematische Annalen. 33: 1–48. doi:10.1007/bf01444109. S2CID 124198118.
- Killing, W. (1889). "Die Zusammensetzung der stetigen endlichen Transformationsgruppen. Dritter Theil". Mathematische Annalen. 34: 57–122. doi:10.1007/BF01446792. S2CID 179177899.
- Killing, W. (1890). "Erweiterung des Begriffes der Invarianten von Transformationsgruppen". Mathematische Annalen. 35 (3): 423–432. doi:10.1007/bf01443863. S2CID 121050972.
- Killing, W. (1890). "Die Zusammensetzung der stetigen endlichen Transformationsgruppen. Vierter Theil". Mathematische Annalen. 36: 161–189. doi:10.1007/bf01207837. S2CID 179178061.
- Killing, W. (1890). "Bestimmung der grössten Untergruppen von endlichen Transformationsgruppen". Mathematische Annalen. 36 (2): 239–254. doi:10.1007/bf01207841. S2CID 121548146.

== See also ==
- Killing equation
- Killing form
- Killing–Hopf theorem
- Killing horizon
- Killing spinor
- Killing tensor
- Killing vector field
- Levi decomposition
- G2 (mathematics)
- Root system
