= Komar, Travnik =

Komar
- Village
- Location within Bosnia and Herzegovina
- Coordinates: 44.1669435°N 17.5284674°E
- Country: Bosnia and Herzegovina
- Entity: Federation of Bosnia and Herzegovina
- Canton: Central Bosnia
- Municipality: Travnik

Area
  - Total: 2.51 sq mi (6.50 km^{2})

Population (2013)
  - Total: 0
  - Density: 0.0/sq mi (0.0/km^{2})
- Time zone: UTC+1 (CET)
  - Summer (DST): UTC+2 (CEST)

Komar is a village in the municipality of Travnik, Bosnia and Herzegovina.

== Demographics ==
According to the 2013 census, its population was nil, down from 311 (mainly Serbs) in 1991.
