= Space form =

In mathematics, a space form is a complete Riemannian manifold M of constant sectional curvature K. The three most fundamental examples are Euclidean n-space, the n-dimensional sphere, and hyperbolic space, although a space form need not be simply connected.

== Reduction to generalized crystallography ==
The Killing–Hopf theorem of Riemannian geometry states that the universal cover of an n-dimensional space form $M^n$ with curvature $K = -1$ is isometric to $H^n$, hyperbolic space; with curvature $K = 0$ is isometric to $R^n$, Euclidean n-space; and with curvature $K = +1$ is isometric to $S^n$, the n-dimensional sphere of points distance 1 from the origin in $R^{n+1}$.

By rescaling the Riemannian metric on $H^n$, we may create a space $M_K$ of constant curvature $K$ for any $K < 0$. Similarly, by rescaling the Riemannian metric on $S^n$, we may create a space $M_K$ of constant curvature $K$ for any $K > 0$. Thus the universal cover of a space form $M$ with constant curvature $K$ is isometric to $M_K$.

This reduces the problem of studying space forms to studying discrete groups of isometries $\Gamma$ of $M_K$ which act properly discontinuously. Note that the fundamental group of $M$, $\pi_1(M)$, will be isomorphic to $\Gamma$. Groups acting in this manner on $R^n$ are called crystallographic groups. Groups acting in this manner on $H^2$ and $H^3$ are called Fuchsian groups and Kleinian groups, respectively.

== See also ==
- Borel conjecture
