= Killing tensor =

Tensor in general relativity

In mathematics, a Killing tensor or Killing tensor field is a generalization of a Killing vector, for symmetric tensor fields instead of just vector fields. It is a concept in Riemannian and pseudo-Riemannian geometry, and is mainly used in the theory of general relativity. Killing tensors satisfy an equation similar to Killing's equation for Killing vectors. Like Killing vectors, every Killing tensor corresponds to a quantity which is conserved along geodesics. However, unlike Killing vectors, which are associated with symmetries (isometries) of a manifold, Killing tensors generally lack such a direct geometric interpretation. Killing tensors are named after Wilhelm Killing.

== Definition and properties ==
In the following definition, parentheses around tensor indices are notation for symmetrization. For example:

$$T_{(\alpha\beta\gamma)} = \frac{1}{6}(T_{\alpha\beta\gamma} + T_{\alpha\gamma\beta} + T_{\beta\alpha\gamma} + T_{\beta\gamma\alpha} + T_{\gamma\alpha\beta} + T_{\gamma\beta\alpha})$$

=== Definition ===
A Killing tensor is a tensor field $K$ (of some order m) on a (pseudo)-Riemannian manifold which is symmetric (that is, $K_{\beta_1 \cdots \beta_m} = K_{(\beta_1 \cdots \beta_m)}$) and satisfies:

$$\nabla_{(\alpha}K_{\beta_1 \cdots \beta_m)} = 0$$

This equation is a generalization of Killing's equation for Killing vectors:

$$\nabla_{(\alpha}K_{\beta)} = \frac{1}{2} (\nabla_{\alpha}K_{\beta} + \nabla_{\beta}K_{\alpha}) = 0$$

=== Properties ===
Killing vectors are a special case of Killing tensors. Another simple example of a Killing tensor is the metric tensor itself. A linear combination of Killing tensors is a Killing tensor. A symmetric product of Killing tensors is also a Killing tensor; that is, if $S_{\alpha_1 \cdots \alpha_l}$ and $T_{\beta_1 \cdots \beta_m}$ are Killing tensors, then $S_{(\alpha_1 \cdots \alpha_l}T_{\beta_1 \cdots \beta_m)}$ is a Killing tensor too.

Every Killing tensor corresponds to a constant of motion on geodesics. More specifically, for every geodesic with tangent vector $u^\alpha$, the quantity $K_{\beta_1 \cdots \beta_m} u^{\beta_1} \cdots u^{\beta_m}$ is constant along the geodesic.

== Examples ==
Since Killing tensors are a generalization of Killing vectors, the examples at Killing vector field § Examples are also examples of Killing tensors. The following examples focus on Killing tensors not simply obtained from Killing vectors.

=== FLRW metric ===
The Friedmann–Lemaître–Robertson–Walker metric, widely used in cosmology, has spacelike Killing vectors corresponding to its spatial symmetries, in particular rotations around arbitrary axes and in the flat case for $k=1$ translations along $x$, $y$, and $z$. It also has a Killing tensor

$$K_{\mu\nu} = a^2 (g_{\mu\nu} + U_{\mu}U_{\nu})$$

where a is the scale factor, $U^{\mu} = (1,0,0,0)$ is the t-coordinate basis vector, and the −+++ signature convention is used.

=== Kerr metric ===
The Kerr metric, describing a rotating black hole, has two independent Killing vectors. One Killing vector corresponds to the time translation symmetry of the metric, and another corresponds to the axial symmetry about the axis of rotation. In addition, as shown by Walker and Penrose (1970), there is a nontrivial Killing tensor of order 2. The constant of motion corresponding to this Killing tensor is called the Carter constant.

== Conformal Killing tensor ==
Conformal Killing tensors are a generalization of Killing tensors and conformal Killing vectors. A conformal Killing tensor is a tensor field $K$ (of some order m) which is symmetric and satisfies

$$\nabla_{(\alpha}K_{\beta_1 \cdots \beta_m)} = k_{(\beta_1 \cdots \beta_{m-1}}  g_{\beta_m \alpha)}$$

for some symmetric tensor field $k$. This generalizes the equation for conformal Killing vectors, which states that

$$\nabla_\alpha K_\beta + \nabla_\beta K_\alpha = \lambda g_{\alpha \beta}$$

for some scalar field $\lambda$.

Every conformal Killing tensor corresponds to a constant of motion along null geodesics. More specifically, for every null geodesic with tangent vector $v^\alpha$, the quantity $K_{\beta_1 \cdots \beta_m} v^{\beta_1} \cdots v^{\beta_m}$ is constant along the geodesic.

The property of being a conformal Killing tensor is preserved under conformal transformations in the following sense. If $K_{\beta_1 \cdots \beta_m}$ is a conformal Killing tensor with respect to a metric $g_{\alpha \beta}$, then $\tilde{K}_{\beta_1 \cdots \beta_m} = u^m K_{\beta_1 \cdots \beta_m}$ is a conformal Killing tensor with respect to the conformally equivalent metric $\tilde{g}_{\alpha \beta} = u g_{\alpha \beta}$, for all positive-valued $u$.

== Killing–Yano tensor ==
An antisymmetric tensor of order p, $f_{a_1 a_2 ... a_p}$, is a Killing–Yano tensor fr:Tenseur de Killing-Yano if it satisfies the equation

$$\nabla_b f_{c a_2 ... a_p} + \nabla_c f_{b a_2 ... a_p} = 0\,$$.

While also a generalization of the Killing vector, it differs from the usual Killing tensor in that the covariant derivative is only contracted with one tensor index.

Killing–Yano tensors are the square root of Killing tensors because of satisfying certain theorems which are put below:

- For a Killing–Yano tensor, $f_{\mu_1\ldots\mu_p}$, the Killing tensor of rank 2 is $k_{\mu\nu} = f_{\mu\mu_2\ldots\mu_p} f_\nu^{{\mu_2}\ldots\mu_p}$
- $f_{\mu\mu_2\ldots\mu_p} p^{\mu_p}$ is parallel transported along the geodesic with tangent vector, $p^{\mu_p}$

Conformal Killing–Yano tensors are a generalization of Killing–Yano tensors. It states that a Conformal Killing–Yano tensor of rank p is totally antisymmetric tensor $k_{\mu_2...\mu_p}$ with p-form if it fulfills:

$\nabla_\mu k_{\mu_1\ldots\mu_p} = \nabla_{[\mu k_{\mu_1\ldots\mu_p}]} +\, }\bar{ p\, g_{\mu[\mu_1} {k}_{\mu_2\ldots\mu_p]}$

where $\bar k_{\mu_2\ldots\mu_p}$ is an asymmetrical tensor of rank p - 1. By doing a contraction of $\mu$ and $\mu_1$, we get:

$\bar k_{\mu_2\ldots\mu_p} = \frac 1 {D - p + 1} \nabla_\mu k_{\mu_2\ldots\mu_p}^\mu$

Closed Conformal Killing–Yano tensors are a special case of Conformal Killing–Yano tensor when $\nabla_\mu k_{\mid{\mu_2\ldots\mu_p}\mid} = 0$ where $k = db$ and b is some p - 1 form. This follows the Hodge duality transformation result which is:

The Hodge dual $k\star$ of a rank p Closed Conformal Killing–Yano tensor $k$ is a Killing–Yano tensor $f \equiv \star k$ of rank D - p and vice-versa.

An important property of Closed Conformal Killing–Yano tensor is that their wedge product is a Closed Conformal Killing–Yano tensor of higher rank. In other words, $k \equiv a \land b$ is a Closed Conformal Killing–Yano tensor of rank p + q, where $a$ is a Closed Conformal Killing–Yano tensor of rank p and $b$ is a Closed Conformal Killing–Yano tensor of rank q.

=== Examples ===
==== Kerr spacetime ====
A particle moving in Kerr spacetime is closely related to Conformal Killing–Yano tensors of rank two. There is one solution for a rotating black hole described by Kerr Metric in which the asymptomatic tensor looks like as follows:

$Y = r^3 sin\,\theta\,d\theta \,\land d\phi + O(1) = \star(\tau_0 \land D)$

where $D$ is a dilation vector field with value $x^\mu {\partial\over\partial x^\mu}$ and $\tau$ is a Killing field with value ${\partial\over\partial x^\mu}$

==== Killing–Yano towers ====
From the wedge product property of Closed Conformal Killing–Yano tensors, many Conformal Killing–Yano tensors can be constructed which is known as Killing–Yano tensor tower. For a $n^{th}$ Closed Conformal Killing–Yano tensor, the Killing–Yano tensor tower is defined as:

$h^{(j)} \equiv h^{\land j} = \land_{n=1}^j h$

where $h^{(j)}$ is a Closed Conformal Killing–Yano tensor of rank $2j$.

==== Bosonic and spinning string ====
In the invariances of tensionless Bosonic string, the expression for the field equation for tension in the string vanishes when $K$ is a killing vector.

$\nabla_{(\mu} K_{\nu)} = \lambda G_{\mu\nu}$

The invariant of the tensionless spinning strings also involves super conformal Killing–Yano tensors.

==== Supersymmetries ====
For a bosonic particle falling in a geodesic background, the supersymmetric transformation with respect to Killing–Yano tensor can be derived. One such supersymmetry transform equation is as follows:

$\delta x^\mu = -i \in \xi^\mu$

==== G-Structures ====
Killing–Yano tensors are also studied in G-Structures which are used in constructing supergravity solutions and also in holonomy manifolds.

== See also ==
- Killing form
- Killing vector field
- Wilhelm Killing
- Kentaro Yano (mathematician)
