= Killing–Hopf theorem =

Characterizes complete connected Riemannian manifolds of constant curvature

In geometry, the Killing–Hopf theorem states that complete connected Riemannian manifolds of constant curvature are isometric to a quotient of a sphere, Euclidean space, or hyperbolic space by a group acting freely and properly discontinuously. These manifolds are called space forms. The Killing–Hopf theorem was proved by Killing (1891) and Hopf (1926).
