= Spacetime symmetries =

Type of symmetry in physics

Spacetime symmetries are features of spacetime that can be described as exhibiting some form of symmetry. The role of symmetry in physics is important in simplifying solutions to many problems. Spacetime symmetries are used in the study of exact solutions of Einstein's field equations of general relativity. Spacetime symmetries are distinguished from internal symmetries.

== Physical motivation ==
Physical problems are often investigated and solved by noticing features which have some form of symmetry. For example, in the Schwarzschild solution, the role of spherical symmetry is important in deriving the Schwarzschild solution and deducing the physical consequences of this symmetry (such as the nonexistence of gravitational radiation in a spherically pulsating star). In cosmological problems, symmetry plays a role in the cosmological principle, which restricts the type of universes that are consistent with large-scale observations (e.g. the Friedmann–Lemaître–Robertson–Walker (FLRW) metric). Symmetries usually require some form of preserving property, the most important of which in general relativity include the following:

- preserving geodesics of the spacetime
- preserving the metric tensor
- preserving the curvature tensor

These and other symmetries will be discussed below in more detail. This preservation property which symmetries usually possess (alluded to above) can be used to motivate a useful definition of these symmetries themselves.

== Mathematical definition ==
A rigorous definition of symmetries in general relativity has been given by Hall (2004). In this approach, the idea is to use (smooth) vector fields whose local flow diffeomorphisms preserve some property of the spacetime. (Note that one should emphasize in one's thinking this is a diffeomorphism—a transformation on a differential element. The implication is that the behavior of objects with extent may not be as manifestly symmetric.) This preserving property of the diffeomorphisms is made precise as follows. A smooth vector field X on a spacetime M is said to preserve a smooth tensor T on M (or T is invariant under X) if, for each smooth local flow diffeomorphism ϕ_{t} associated with X, the tensors T and ϕ^{∗}_{t}(T) are equal on the domain of ϕ_{t}. This statement is equivalent to the more usable condition that the Lie derivative of the tensor under the vector field vanishes:
$$\mathcal{L}_X T = 0$$
on M. This has the consequence that, given any two points p and q on M, the coordinates of T in a coordinate system around p are equal to the coordinates of T in a coordinate system around q. A symmetry on the spacetime is a smooth vector field whose local flow diffeomorphisms preserve some (usually geometrical) feature of the spacetime. The (geometrical) feature may refer to specific tensors (such as the metric, or the energy–momentum tensor) or to other aspects of the spacetime such as its geodesic structure. The vector fields are sometimes referred to as collineations, symmetry vector fields or just symmetries. The set of all symmetry vector fields on M forms a Lie algebra under the Lie bracket operation as can be seen from the identity:
$$\mathcal{L}_{[X,Y]} T = \mathcal{L}_X (\mathcal{L}_Y T) - \mathcal{L}_Y (\mathcal{L}_X T)$$
the term on the right usually being written, with an abuse of notation, as
$$[\mathcal{L}_X, \mathcal{L}_Y] T.$$

== Killing symmetry ==
A Killing vector field is one of the most important types of symmetries and is defined to be a smooth vector field X that preserves the metric tensor g:
$$\mathcal{L}_X g = 0.$$

This is usually written in the expanded form as:
$$X_{a;b} + X_{b;a} = 0.$$

Killing vector fields find extensive applications (including in classical mechanics) and are related to conservation laws.

== Homothetic symmetry ==
A homothetic vector field is one which satisfies:
$$\mathcal{L}_X g = 2 c g .$$
where c is a real constant. Homothetic vector fields find application in the study of singularities in general relativity.

== Affine symmetry ==
An affine vector field is one that satisfies:
$$(\mathcal{L}_X g)_{ab;c} = 0$$

An affine vector field preserves geodesics and preserves the affine parameter.

The above three vector field types are special cases of projective vector fields which preserve geodesics without necessarily preserving the affine parameter.

== Conformal symmetry ==
A conformal vector field is one which satisfies:
$$\mathcal{L}_X g = \phi g$$
where ϕ is a smooth real-valued function on M.

== Curvature symmetry ==
A curvature collineation is a vector field which preserves the Riemann tensor:
$$\mathcal{L}_X {R^a}_{bcd} = 0$$

where R^{a}_{bcd} are the components of the Riemann tensor. The set of all smooth curvature collineations forms a Lie algebra under the Lie bracket operation (if the smoothness condition is dropped, the set of all curvature collineations need not form a Lie algebra). The Lie algebra is denoted by CC(M) and may be infinite-dimensional. Every affine vector field is a curvature collineation.

== Matter symmetry ==
A less well-known form of symmetry concerns vector fields that preserve the energy–momentum tensor. These are variously referred to as matter collineations or matter symmetries and are defined by:
$$\mathcal{L}_X T = 0$$
where T is the covariant energy–momentum tensor. The intimate relation between geometry and physics may be highlighted here, as the vector field X is regarded as preserving certain physical quantities along the flow lines of X, this being true for any two observers. In connection with this, it may be shown that every Killing vector field is a matter collineation (by the Einstein field equations, with or without cosmological constant). Thus, given a solution of the EFE, a vector field that preserves the metric necessarily preserves the corresponding energy–momentum tensor. When the energy–momentum tensor represents a perfect fluid, every Killing vector field preserves the energy density, pressure and the fluid flow vector field. When the energy–momentum tensor represents an electromagnetic field, a Killing vector field does not necessarily preserve the electric and magnetic fields.

== Applications ==
As mentioned at the start of this article, the main application of these symmetries occur in general relativity, where solutions of Einstein's equations may be classified by imposing some certain symmetries on the spacetime.

=== Spacetime classifications ===
Classifying solutions of the EFE constitutes a large part of general relativity research. Various approaches to classifying spacetimes, including using the Segre classification of the energy–momentum tensor or the Petrov classification of the Weyl tensor have been studied extensively by many researchers, most notably Stephani et al. (2003). They also classify spacetimes using symmetry vector fields (especially Killing and homothetic symmetries). For example, Killing vector fields may be used to classify spacetimes, as there is a limit to the number of global, smooth Killing vector fields that a spacetime may possess (the maximum being ten for four-dimensional spacetimes). Generally speaking, the higher the dimension of the algebra of symmetry vector fields on a spacetime, the more symmetry the spacetime admits. For example, the Schwarzschild solution has a Killing algebra of dimension four (three spatial rotational vector fields and a time translation), whereas the Friedmann–Lemaître–Robertson–Walker metric (excluding the Einstein static subcase) has a Killing algebra of dimension six (three translations and three rotations). The Einstein static metric has a Killing algebra of dimension seven (the previous six plus a time translation).

The assumption of a spacetime admitting a certain symmetry vector field can place restrictions on the spacetime.

=== List of symmetric spacetimes ===
The following spacetimes have their own distinct articles in Wikipedia:

- Static spacetime
- Stationary spacetime
- Spherically symmetric spacetime
- Minkowski Space
- de Sitter space
- Anti-de Sitter space

== See also ==
- Derivations of the Lorentz transformations
- Field (physics) – Physical quantities taking values at each point in space and time
- Killing tensor – Tensor in general relativity
- Noether's theorem – Statement relating differentiable symmetries to conserved quantities
- Ricci decomposition
- Symmetry in physics – Feature of a system that is preserved under some transformation
- Symmetry in quantum mechanics – Properties underlying modern physics
- Lie groups – Group that is also a differentiable manifold with group operations that are smooth
- Lorentz group – Lie group of Lorentz transformations
- Poincaré group – Group of flat spacetime symmetries
- Bondi–Metzner–Sachs group – Asymptotic symmetry group of General Relativity
- Ehlers group – Physics concept
- Geroch group – Group of solutions to Einstein field equations
