= Killing vector field =

Vector field on a pseudo-Riemannian manifold that preserves the metric tensor

In mathematics and theoretical physics, a Killing vector field or Killing field (named after Wilhelm Killing) is a vector field on a Riemannian manifold or pseudo-Riemannian manifold that preserves the metric.

Flows generated by Killing vector fields are continuous isometries of the manifold. This means that the flow generates a symmetry, in the sense that moving each point of an object the same distance in the direction of the Killing vector will not distort distances on the object.

== Definitions ==
A vector field $X$ on a Riemannian or pseudo-Riemannian manifold $(M,g)$ is called a Killing vector if the Lie derivative with respect to $X$ of the metric tensor $g$ vanishes:

$\mathcal{L}_{X} g = 0.$

Equivalently, the flow of $X$ consists of local isometries of $g$; for this reason, Killing vector fields are called by some authors infinitesimal isometries.

In terms of the Levi-Civita connection, the condition of being a Killing vector field is

$$g\left(\nabla_Y X, Z\right) + g\left(Y, \nabla_Z X\right) = 0$$

for all vectors $Y$ and $Z$. In local coordinates, this amounts to the Killing equation

$$\nabla_\mu X_\nu + \nabla_{\nu} X_\mu = 0 \,.$$

This condition is expressed in covariant form. Therefore, it is sufficient to establish it in a preferred coordinate system in order to have it hold in all coordinate systems.

== Examples ==
=== Circle ===
The Killing field on the circle and flow along the Killing field.

The vector field on a circle that points counterclockwise and has the same magnitude at each point is a Killing vector field, since moving each point on the circle along this vector field simply rotates the circle.

=== Hyperbolic plane ===
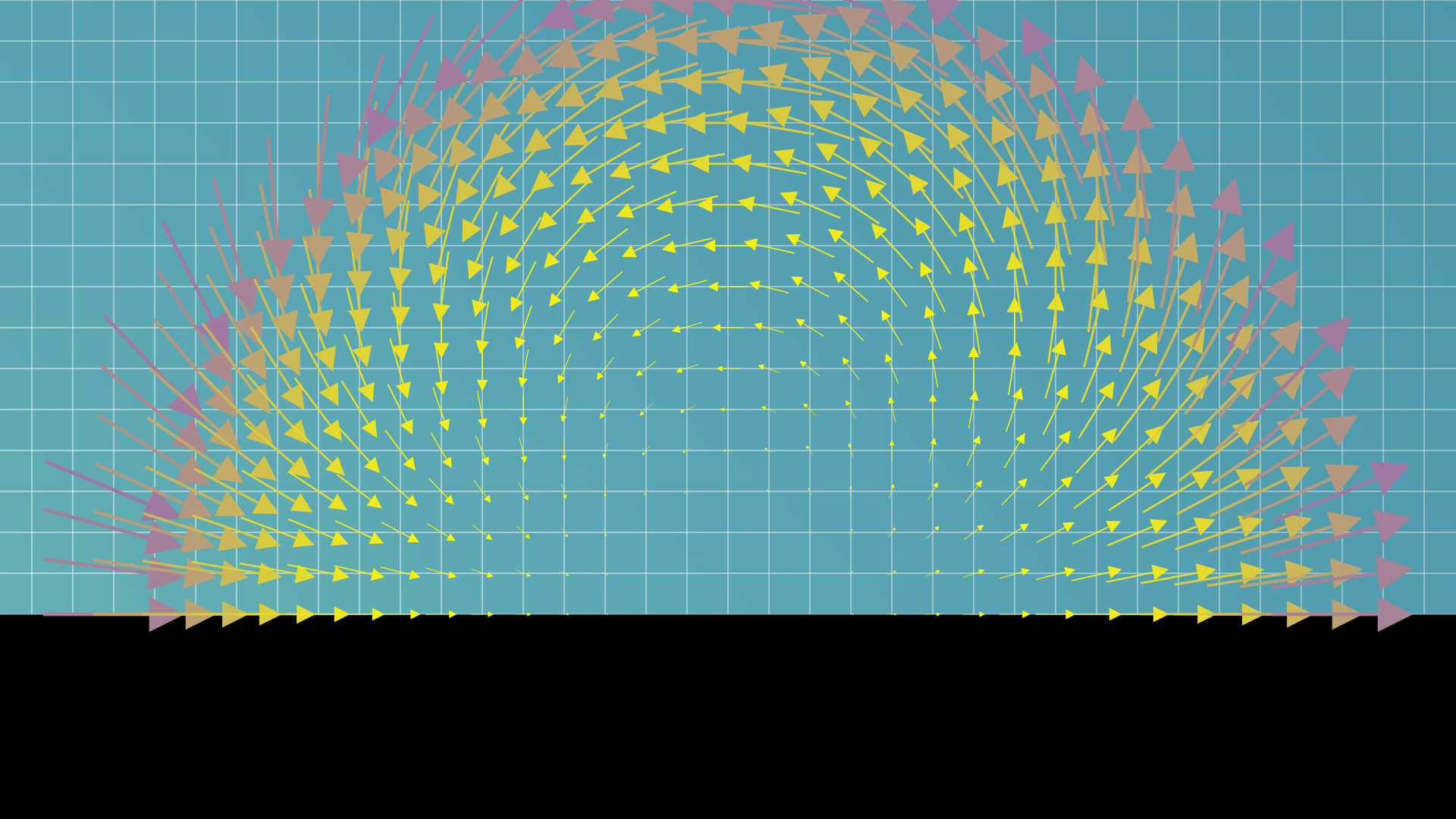
Killing field on the upper-half plane model, on a semi-circular selection of points. This Killing vector field generates the special conformal transformation. The colour indicates the magnitude of the vector field at that point.

A toy example for a Killing vector field is on the upper half-plane $M = \mathbb{R}^2_{y > 0}$ equipped with the Poincaré metric $g = y^{-2}\left(dx^2 + dy^2\right)$. The pair $(M, g)$ is typically called the hyperbolic plane and has Killing vector field $\partial_x$ (using standard coordinates). This should be intuitively clear since the covariant derivative $\nabla_{\partial_x}g$ transports the metric tensor along an integral curve generated by the vector field (whose image is parallel to the x-axis).

Furthermore, the metric tensor is independent of $x$ from which we can immediately conclude that $\partial_x$ is a Killing field using one of the results below in this article.

The isometry group of the upper half-plane model (or rather, the component connected to the identity) is $\text{SL}(2, \mathbb{R})$ (see Poincaré half-plane model), and the other two Killing fields may be derived from considering the action of the generators of $\text{SL}(2, \mathbb{R})$ on the upper half-plane. The other two generating Killing fields are dilatation $D = x\partial_x + y\partial_y$ and the special conformal transformation $K = (x^2 - y^2)\partial_x + 2xy \partial_y$.

=== 2-sphere ===
Killing field on the sphere. This Killing vector field generates rotation around the z-axis. The colour indicates the height of the base point of each vector in the field. Enlarge for animation of flow along Killing field.

The Killing fields of the two-sphere $S^2$, or more generally the $n$-sphere $S^n$ should be obvious from ordinary intuition: spheres, having rotational symmetry, should possess Killing fields which generate rotations about any axis. That is, we expect $S^2$ to have symmetry under the action of the 3D rotation group SO(3). That is, by using the a priori knowledge that spheres can be embedded in Euclidean space, it is immediately possible to guess the form of the Killing fields.

The conventional chart for the 2-sphere embedded in $\mathbb{R}^3$ in Cartesian coordinates $(x,y,z)$ is given by

$$x = \sin\theta\cos\phi,\qquad y = \sin\theta\sin\phi,\qquad z = \cos\theta$$

so that $\theta$ parametrises the height, and $\phi$ parametrises rotation about the $z$-axis.

The pullback of the standard Cartesian metric $ds^2 = dx^2 + dy^2 + dz^2$ gives the standard metric on the sphere,

$$ds^2 = d\theta^2 + \sin^2\theta d\phi^2 .$$

Intuitively, a rotation about any axis should be an isometry. In this chart, the vector field which generates rotations about the $z$-axis:

$$\frac{\partial}{\partial\phi}.$$

In these coordinates, the metric components are all independent of $\phi$, which shows that $\partial_\phi$ is a Killing field.

The vector field

$$\frac{\partial}{\partial\theta}$$

is not a Killing field; the coordinate $\theta$ explicitly appears in the metric. The flow generated by $\partial_\theta$ goes from north to south; points at the north pole spread apart, those at the south come together. Any transformation that moves points closer or farther apart cannot be an isometry; therefore, the generator of such motion cannot be a Killing field.

The generator $\partial_\phi$ is recognized as a rotation about the $z$-axis

$$Z = x\partial_y - y\partial_x = \sin^2\theta \,\partial_\phi$$

A second generator, for rotations about the $x$-axis, is

$$X = y\partial_z - z\partial_y$$

The third generator, for rotations about the $y$-axis, is

$$Y = z\partial_x - x\partial_z$$

The algebra given by linear combinations of these three generators closes, and obeys the relations

$$[X,Y] = -Z \quad [Y,Z] = -X \quad [Z,X] = -Y.$$

This is the Lie algebra $\mathfrak{so}(3)$.

Expressing $X$ and $Y$ in terms of spherical coordinates gives

$$X = - \sin^2\theta \,(\sin\phi\partial_\theta + \cot\theta\cos\phi\partial_\phi)$$

and

$$Y = \sin^2 \theta \,(\cos\phi\partial_\theta - \cot\theta\sin\phi\partial_\phi)$$

That these three vector fields are actually Killing fields can be determined in two different ways. One is by explicit computation: just plug in explicit expressions for $\mathcal{L}_Xg$ and chug to show that $\mathcal{L}_Xg=\mathcal{L}_Yg=\mathcal{L}_Zg=0$. This is a worth-while exercise. Alternately, one can recognize $X, Y$ and $Z$ are the generators of isometries in Euclidean space, and since the metric on the sphere is inherited from metric in Euclidean space, the isometries are inherited as well.

These three Killing fields form a complete set of generators for the algebra. They are not unique: any linear combination of these three fields is still a Killing field.

There are several subtle points to note about this example.

- The three fields are not globally non-zero; indeed, the field $Z$ vanishes at the north and south poles; likewise, $X$ and $Y$ vanish at antipodes on the equator. One way to understand this is as a consequence of the "hairy ball theorem". This property, of bald spots, is a general property of symmetric spaces in the Cartan decomposition. At each point on the manifold, the algebra of the Killing fields splits naturally into two parts, one part which is tangent to the manifold, and another part which is vanishing (at the point where the decomposition is being made).
- The three fields $X, Y$ and $Z$ are not of unit length. One can normalize by dividing by the common factor of $\sin^2\theta$ appearing in all three expressions. However, in that case, the fields are no longer smooth: for example, $\partial_\phi = X/\sin^2\theta$ is singular (non-differentiable) at the north and south poles.
- The three fields are not point-wise orthogonal; indeed, they cannot be, as, at any given point, the tangent-plane is two-dimensional, while there are three vectors. Given any point on the sphere, there is some non-trivial linear combination of $X, Y$ and $Z$ that vanishes: these three vectors are an over-complete basis for the two-dimensional tangent plane at that point.
- The a priori knowledge that spheres can be embedded into Euclidean space, and thus inherit a metric tensor from this embedding, leads to a confusing intuition about the correct number of Killing fields that one might expect. Without such an embedding, intuition might suggest that the number of linearly independent generators would be no greater than the dimension of the tangent bundle. After all, fixing any point on a manifold, one can only move in those directions that are tangent. The dimension of the tangent bundle for the 2-sphere is two, and yet three Killing fields are found. Again, this "surprise" is a generic property of symmetric spaces.

=== Minkowski space ===
The Killing fields of Minkowski space are the 3 space translations, time translation, three generators of rotations (the little group) and the three generators of boosts. These are

- Time and space translations
  $$\partial_t ~, \qquad  \partial_x ~, \qquad \partial_y ~, \qquad \partial_z ~;$$
- Vector fields generating three rotations, often called the J generators,
  $$-y \partial_x + x \partial_y ~, \qquad  -z \partial_y + y \partial_z ~, \qquad -x \partial_z + z \partial_x  ~;$$
- Vector fields generating three boosts, the K generators,
  $$x \partial_t + t \partial_x~, \qquad  y \partial_t + t \partial_y ~, \qquad z \partial_t + t \partial_z.$$

The boosts and rotations generate the Lorentz group. Together with space-time translations, this forms the Lie algebra for the Poincaré group.

=== Flat space ===
Here we derive the Killing fields for general flat space. From Killing's equation and the Ricci identity for a covector $K_a$,

$$\nabla_a\nabla_b K_c - \nabla_b\nabla_a K_c = R^d{}_{cab}K_d$$

(using abstract index notation) where $R^a{}_{bcd}$ is the Riemann curvature tensor, the following identity may be proven for a Killing field $X^a$:

$$\nabla_a\nabla_b X_c = R^d{}_{acb}X_d.$$

When the base manifold $M$ is flat space, that is, Euclidean space or pseudo-Euclidean space (as for Minkowski space), we can choose global flat coordinates such that in these coordinates, the Levi-Civita connection and hence Riemann curvature vanishes everywhere, giving

$$\partial_\mu\partial_\nu X_\rho = 0.$$

Integrating and imposing the Killing equation allows us to write the general solution to $X_\rho$ as

$$X^\rho = \omega^{\rho\sigma} x_\sigma + c^\rho$$

where $\omega^{\mu\nu} = -\omega^{\nu\mu}$ is antisymmetric. By taking appropriate values of $\omega^{\mu\nu}$ and $c^\rho$, we get a basis for the generalised Poincaré algebra of isometries of flat space:

$$M_{\mu\nu} = x_\mu\partial_\nu - x_\nu\partial_\mu$$
$$P_\rho = \partial_\rho.$$

These generate pseudo-rotations (rotations and boosts) and translations respectively. Intuitively these preserve the metric tensor at each point.

For (pseudo-)Euclidean space of total dimension, in total there are $n(n+1)/2$ generators, making flat space maximally symmetric. This number is generic for maximally symmetric spaces. Maximally symmetric spaces can be considered as sub-manifolds of flat space, arising as surfaces of constant proper distance

$$\{\mathbf{x}\in\mathbb{R}^{p,q}:\eta(\mathbf{x},\mathbf{x})=\pm \frac{1}{\kappa^2}\}$$

which have O(p, q) symmetry. If the submanifold has dimension $n$, this group of symmetries has the expected dimension (as a Lie group).

Heuristically, we can derive the dimension of the Killing field algebra. Treating Killing's equation $\nabla_a X_b + \nabla_b X_a = 0$ together with the identity $\nabla_a\nabla_b X_d = R^c{}_{bad}X_c$. as a system of second order differential equations for $X_a$, we can determine the value of $X_a$ at any point given initial data at a point $p$. The initial data specifies $X_a(p)$ and $\nabla_a X_b(p)$, but Killing's equation imposes that the covariant derivative is antisymmetric. In total this is $n^2 - n(n-1)/2 = n(n+1)/2$ independent values of initial data.

For concrete examples, see below for examples of flat space (Minkowski space) and maximally symmetric spaces (sphere, hyperbolic space).

=== General relativity ===
Killing fields are used to discuss isometries in general relativity (in which the geometry of spacetime as distorted by gravitational fields is viewed as a 4-dimensional pseudo-Riemannian manifold). In a static configuration, in which nothing changes with time, the time vector will be a Killing vector, and thus the Killing field will point in the direction of forward motion in time. For example, the Schwarzschild metric has four Killing fields: the metric tensor is independent of $t$, hence $\partial_t$ is a time-like Killing field. The other three are the three generators of rotations discussed above. The Kerr metric for a rotating black hole has only two Killing fields: the time-like field, and a field generating rotations about the axis of rotation of the black hole.

De Sitter space and anti-de Sitter space are maximally symmetric spaces, with the $n$-dimensional versions of each possessing $\textstyle \frac{n(n+1)}{2}$ Killing fields.

=== Of a constant coordinate ===
If the metric tensor coefficients $g_{\mu \nu}$ in some coordinate basis $dx^{a}$ are independent of one of the coordinates $x^{\kappa}$, then $K^{\mu} = \delta^{\mu}_{\kappa}$ is a Killing vector, where $\delta^{\mu}_{\kappa}$ is the Kronecker delta.

To prove this, let us assume $g_{\mu \nu, 0} = 0$. Then $K^\mu = \delta^\mu_0$ and $K_{\mu} = g_{\mu \nu} K^\nu = g_{\mu \nu} \delta^\nu_0 = g_{\mu 0}$.

Now let us look at the Killing condition

$$K_{\mu;\nu} + K_{\nu;\mu} = K_{\mu,\nu} + K_{\nu,\mu} - 2\Gamma^\rho_{\mu\nu}K_\rho = g_{\mu 0,\nu} + g_{\nu 0,\mu} - g^{\rho\sigma}(g_{\sigma\mu,\nu} + g_{\sigma\nu,\mu} - g_{\mu\nu,\sigma})g_{\rho 0}$$

and from $g_{\rho 0}g^{\rho \sigma} = \delta_0^\sigma$. The Killing condition becomes

$$g_{\mu 0,\nu} + g_{\nu 0,\mu} - (g_{0\mu,\nu} + g_{0\nu,\mu} - g_{\mu\nu,0}) = 0 ;$$

that is, $g_{\mu\nu,0} = 0$, which is true.

- The physical meaning is, for example, that, if none of the metric tensor coefficients is a function of time, the manifold must automatically have a time-like Killing vector.
- In layman's terms, if an object doesn't transform or "evolve" in time (when time passes), time passing won't change the measures of the object. Formulated like this, the result sounds like a tautology, but one has to understand that the example is very much contrived: Killing fields apply also to much more complex and interesting cases.

Conversely, if the metric tensor $\mathbf{g}$ admits a Killing field $X^a$, then one can construct coordinates for which $\partial_0 g_{\mu\nu} = 0$. These coordinates are constructed by taking a hypersurface $\Sigma$ such that $X^a$ is nowhere tangent to $\Sigma$. Take coordinates $x^i$ on $\Sigma$, then define local coordinates $(t,x^i)$ where $t$ denotes the parameter along the integral curve of $X^a$ based at $(x^i)$ on $\Sigma$. In these coordinates, the Lie derivative reduces to the coordinate derivative, that is,

$$\mathcal{L}_Xg_{\mu\nu} = \partial_0 g_{\mu\nu}$$

and by the definition of the Killing field the left-hand side vanishes.

== Properties ==
A Killing field is determined uniquely by a vector at some point and its gradient (i.e. all covariant derivatives of the field at the point).

The Lie bracket of two Killing fields is still a Killing field. The Killing fields on a manifold $M$ thus form a Lie subalgebra of vector fields on $M$. This is the Lie algebra of the isometry group of the manifold if $M$ is complete. A Riemannian manifold with a transitive group of isometries is a homogeneous space.

For compact manifolds

- negative Ricci curvature implies there are no nontrivial (nonzero) Killing fields;
- nonpositive Ricci curvature implies that any Killing field is parallel. i.e. covariant derivative along any vector field is identically zero;
- if the sectional curvature is positive and the dimension of $M$ is even, a Killing field must have a zero.

The covariant divergence of every Killing vector field vanishes.

If $X$ is a Killing vector field and $Y$ is a harmonic vector field, then $g(X, Y)$ is a harmonic function.

If $X$ is a Killing vector field and $\omega$ is a harmonic p-form, then $\mathcal{L}_{X} \omega = 0$.

=== Geodesics ===
Each Killing vector corresponds to a quantity which is conserved along geodesics. This conserved quantity is the metric product between the Killing vector and the geodesic tangent vector. Along an affinely parametrized geodesic with tangent vector $U^a$ then given the Killing vector $X_b$, the quantity $U^bX_b$ is conserved:

$$U^a\nabla_a(U^bX_b)=0$$

This aids in analytically studying motions in a spacetime with symmetries.

=== Stress-energy tensor ===
Given a conserved, symmetric tensor $T^{ab}$, that is, one satisfying $T^{ab} = T^{ba}$ and $\nabla_a T^{ab}=0$, which are properties typical of a stress-energy tensor, and a Killing vector $X_b$, we can construct the conserved quantity $J^a := T^{ab}X_b$ satisfying

$$\nabla_a J^a = 0.$$

=== Cartan decomposition ===
As noted above, the Lie bracket of two Killing fields is still a Killing field. The Killing fields on a manifold $M$ thus form a Lie subalgebra $\mathfrak{g}$ of all vector fields on $M$. Selecting a point $p \in M$, the algebra $\mathfrak{g}$ can be decomposed into two parts:

$$\mathfrak{h} = \{ X\in\mathfrak{g} : X(p) = 0 \}$$

and

$$\mathfrak{m} = \{ X\in\mathfrak{g} : \nabla X(p) = 0 \}$$

where $\nabla$ is the covariant derivative. These two parts intersect trivially but do not in general split $\mathfrak{g}$. For instance, if $M$ is a Riemannian homogeneous space, we have $\mathfrak{g} = \mathfrak{h} \oplus \mathfrak{m}$ if and only if $M$ is a Riemannian symmetric space.

Intuitively, the isometries of $M$ locally define a submanifold $N$ of the total space, and the Killing fields show how to "slide along" that submanifold. They span the tangent space of that submanifold. The tangent space $T_pN$ should have the same dimension as the isometries acting effectively at that point. That is, one expects $T_pN \cong \mathfrak{m}$. Yet, in general, the number of Killing fields is larger than the dimension of that tangent space. How can this be? The answer is that the "extra" Killing fields are redundant. Taken all together, the fields provide an over-complete basis for the tangent space at any particular selected point; linear combinations can be made to vanish at that particular point. This was seen in the example of the Killing fields on a 2-sphere: there are three Killing vector fields; at any given point, two span the tangent space at that point, and the third one is a linear combination of the other two. Picking any two defines $\mathfrak{m}$; the remaining degenerate linear combinations define an orthogonal space $\mathfrak{h}$.

=== Cartan involution ===
The Cartan involution is defined as the mirroring or reversal of the direction of a geodesic. Its differential flips the direction of the tangents to a geodesic. It is a linear operator of norm one; it has two invariant subspaces, of eigenvalue +1 and −1. These two subspaces correspond to $\mathfrak{h}$ and $\mathfrak{m}$, respectively.

This can be made more precise. Fixing a point $p \in M$ consider a geodesic $\gamma: \mathbb{R} \to M$ passing through $p$, with $\gamma(0) = p$. The involution $\sigma_p$ is defined as

$$\sigma_p(\gamma(\lambda)) = \gamma(-\lambda)$$

This map is an involution, in that $\sigma_p^2 = 1$. When restricted to geodesics along the Killing fields, it is also clearly an isometry. It is uniquely defined.

Let $G$ be the group of isometries generated by the Killing fields. The function $s_p: G \to G$ defined by

$$s_p(g) = \sigma_p \circ g \circ \sigma_p = \sigma_p \circ g \circ \sigma_p^{-1}$$

is a homomorphism of $G$. Its infinitesimal $\theta_p: \mathfrak{g} \to \mathfrak{g}$ is

$$\theta_p(X) = \left. \frac{d}{d\lambda} s_p\left(e^{\lambda X}\right) \right|_{\lambda=0}$$

The Cartan involution is a Lie algebra homomorphism, in that

$$\theta_p[X, Y] = \left[\theta_p X, \theta_p Y\right]$$

for all $X, Y \in \mathfrak{g}$. The subspace $\mathfrak{m}$ has odd parity under the Cartan involution, while $\mathfrak{h}$ has even parity. That is, denoting the Cartan involution at point $p \in M$ as $\theta_p$ one has

$$\left.\theta_p\right|_{\mathfrak{m}} = -\mathrm{id}$$

and

$$\left.\theta_p\right|_{\mathfrak{h}} = +\mathrm{id}$$

where $\mathrm{id}$ is the identity map. From this, it follows that the subspace $\mathfrak{h}$ is a Lie subalgebra of $\mathfrak{g}$, in that $[\mathfrak{h}, \mathfrak{h}] \subset \mathfrak{h}$. As these are even and odd parity subspaces, the Lie brackets split, so that $[\mathfrak{h}, \mathfrak{m}] \subset \mathfrak{m}$ and $[\mathfrak{m}, \mathfrak{m}] \subset \mathfrak{h}$.

The above decomposition holds at all points $p \in M$ for a symmetric space $M$; proofs can be found in Jost. They also hold in more general settings, but not necessarily at all points of the manifold.

For the special case of a symmetric space, one explicitly has that $T_pM \cong \mathfrak{m}$; that is, the Killing fields span the entire tangent space of a symmetric space. Equivalently, the curvature tensor is covariantly constant on locally symmetric spaces, and so these are locally parallelizable; this is the Cartan–Ambrose–Hicks theorem.

== Generalizations ==
- Killing vector fields can be generalized to conformal Killing vector fields defined by $\mathcal{L}_{X} g = \lambda g$ for some scalar $\lambda$. The derivatives of one parameter families of conformal maps are conformal Killing fields.
- Killing tensor fields are symmetric tensor fields $T$ such that the trace-free part of the symmetrization of $\nabla T$ vanishes. Examples of manifolds with Killing tensors include the rotating black hole and the FRW cosmology.
- Killing vector fields can also be defined on any manifold M (possibly without a metric tensor) if we take any Lie group $G$ acting on it instead of the group of isometries. In this broader sense, a Killing vector field is the pushforward of a right invariant vector field on $G$ by the group action. If the group action is effective, then the space of the Killing vector fields is isomorphic to the Lie algebra $\mathfrak{g}$ of $G$.

== See also ==
- Affine vector field
- Curvature collineation
- Homothetic vector field
- Killing form
- Killing horizon
- Killing spinor
- Matter collineation
- Spacetime symmetries
