= List of things named after Karl Schwarzschild =

Things named after the astronomy and relativity scientist Karl Schwarzschild (1873–1916) include:

- Institutions:
  - Karl Schwarzschild Medal
  - Karl Schwarzschild Observatory
- Astronomical features:
  - Lunar crater Schwarzschild
  - Asteroid 837 Schwarzschilda
- Technical terms:
  - Schwarzschild constant
  - Schwarzschild effect in photography, also known as reciprocity failure, and important for calibrating astronomical measurement
    - Schwarzschild law, empirical equation relating to Schwarzschild effect
  - Schwarzschild criterion, in astronomy
  - Schwarzschild coordinates
  - Schwarzschild's equation for radiative transfer
  - Relativity terms:
    - Schwarzschild metric (closely related to Schwarzschild solution, Schwarzschild geometry, Schwarzschild black hole, and Schwarzschild vacuum)
      - de Sitter–Schwarzschild metric
      - Distorted Schwarzschild metric
      - Schwarzschild geodesics
    - Schwarzschild fluid solution
    - Schwarzschild kugelblitz
    - Schwarzschild radius (closely related to Schwarzschild horizon)
    - Schwarzschild wormholes
    - Schwarzschild telescope
