= Schwarzschild (disambiguation) =

Schwarzschild is a German-derived surname borne by various individuals.

Schwarzschild also may refer to:

- Astronomical features:
  - Schwarzschild (crater) on the Moon
  - 837 Schwarzschilda, asteroid
- Institutions:
  - Awardings of the Karl Schwarzschild Medal
  - The Karl Schwarzschild Observatory
- Fiction
  - Schwarzschild (character), a Marvel Comics character

== See also ==
- List of entities named after scientist Karl Schwarzschild
