= Conformastatic spacetimes =

Class of solutions to Einstein's equation in general relativity

Conformastatic spacetimes refer to a special class of static solutions to Einstein's equation in general relativity.

== Introduction ==
The line element for the conformastatic class of solutions in Weyl's canonical coordinates reads
$(1)\qquad ds^2 = - e^{2 \Psi(\rho,\phi,z)} dt^2 + e^{-2 \Psi(\rho,\phi,z) } \Big(d \rho^2 + d z^2 + \rho^2 d \phi^2 \Big)\;,$
as a solution to the field equation
$(2)\qquad R_{ab}-\frac{1}{2}Rg_{ab}=8\pi T_{ab}\;.$
Eq(1) has only one metric function $\Psi(\rho,\phi,z)$ to be identified, and for each concrete $\Psi(\rho,\phi,z)$, Eq(1) would yields a specific conformastatic spacetime.

== Reduced electrovac field equations ==
In consistency with the conformastatic geometry Eq(1), the electrostatic field would arise from an electrostatic potential $A_a$ without spatial symmetry:
$(3)\qquad A_a = \Phi(\rho,z,\phi) [dt]_a\;,$
which would yield the electromagnetic field tensor $F_{ab}$ by
$(4)\qquad F_{ab} = A_{b\,;a}-A_{a\,;b}\;,$
as well as the corresponding stress–energy tensor by
$(5)\qquad T_{ab}^{(EM)} = \frac{1}{4\pi}\Big(F_{ac}F_b^{\;\;c}-\frac{1}{4}g_{ab}F_{cd}F^{cd} \Big)\;.$

Plug Eq(1) and Eqs(3)(4)(5) into "trace-free" (R=0) Einstein's field equation, and one could obtain the reduced field equations for the metric function $\Psi(\rho,\phi,z)$:

$(6)\qquad \nabla^2\Psi \,=\,e^{- 2 \Psi} \,\nabla\Phi\, \nabla\Phi$
$(7)\qquad \Psi_i \Psi_j = e^{-2 \Psi} \Phi_i \Phi_j$

where $\nabla^2 = \partial_{\rho\rho}+\frac{1}{\rho}\,\partial_\rho +\frac{1}{\rho^2}\partial_{\phi\phi}+\partial_{zz}$ and $\nabla=\partial_\rho\, \hat{e}_\rho +\frac{1}{\rho}\partial_\phi\, \hat{e}_\phi +\partial_z\, \hat{e}_z$ are respectively the generic Laplace and gradient operators. in Eq(7), $i\,,j$ run freely over the coordinates $[\rho, z, \phi]$.

== Examples ==
=== Extremal Reissner–Nordström spacetime ===
The extremal Reissner–Nordström spacetime is a typical conformastatic solution. In this case, the metric function is identified as

$(8)\qquad \Psi_{ERN}\,=\,\ln\frac{L}{L+M}\;,\quad L=\sqrt{\rho^2+z^2}\;,$

which put Eq(1) into the concrete form

$(9)\qquad ds^2=-\frac{L^2}{(L+M)^2}dt^2+\frac{(L+M)^2}{L^2}\,\big(d\rho^2+dz^2+\rho^2d\varphi^2\big)\;.$

Applying the transformations

$(10)\;\;\quad L=r-M\;,\quad z=(r-M)\cos\theta\;,\quad \rho=(r-M)\sin\theta\;,$

one obtains the usual form of the line element of extremal Reissner–Nordström solution,

$(11)\;\;\quad ds^2=-\Big(1-\frac{M}{r}\Big)^2 dt^2+\Big(1-\frac{M}{r}\Big)^{-2} dr^2+r^2 \Big(d\theta^2+\sin^2\theta\,d\phi^2\Big)\;.$

=== Charged dust disks ===
Some conformastatic solutions have been adopted to describe charged dust disks.

== Comparison with Weyl spacetimes ==
Many solutions, such as the extremal Reissner–Nordström solution discussed above, can be treated as either a conformastatic metric or Weyl metric, so it would be helpful to make a comparison between them. The Weyl spacetimes refer to the static, axisymmetric class of solutions to Einstein's equation, whose line element takes the following form (still in Weyl's canonical coordinates):
$(12)\;\;\quad ds^2=-e^{2\psi(\rho,z)}dt^2+e^{2\gamma(\rho,z)-2\psi(\rho,z)}(d\rho^2+dz^2)+e^{-2\psi(\rho,z)}\rho^2 d\phi^2\,.$
Hence, a Weyl solution become conformastatic if the metric function $\gamma(\rho,z)$ vanishes, and the other metric function $\psi(\rho,z)$ drops the axial symmetry:
$(13)\;\;\quad \gamma(\rho,z)\equiv 0\;, \quad \psi(\rho,z)\mapsto \Psi(\rho,\phi,z) \,.$
The Weyl electrovac field equations would reduce to the following ones with $\gamma(\rho,z)$:

$(14.a)\quad \nabla^2 \psi =\,(\nabla\psi)^2$
$(14.b)\quad \nabla^2\psi =\,e^{-2\psi} (\nabla\Phi)^2$
$(14.c)\quad \psi^2_{,\,\rho}-\psi^2_{,\,z}=e^{-2\psi}\big(\Phi^2_{,\,\rho}-\Phi^2_{,\,z}\big)$
$(14.d)\quad 2\psi_{,\,\rho}\psi_{,\,z}= 2e^{-2\psi}\Phi_{,\,\rho}\Phi_{,\,z}$
$(14.e)\quad \nabla^2\Phi =\,2\nabla\psi \nabla\Phi\,,$

where $\nabla^2 = \partial_{\rho\rho}+\frac{1}{\rho}\,\partial_\rho +\partial_{zz}$ and $\nabla=\partial_\rho\, \hat{e}_\rho +\partial_z\, \hat{e}_z$ are respectively the reduced cylindrically symmetric Laplace and gradient operators.

It is also noticeable that, Eqs(14) for Weyl are consistent but not identical with the conformastatic Eqs(6)(7) above.

== See also ==
- Weyl metrics
- Reissner–Nordström metric
