= Karl Schwarzschild =

German physicist (1873–1916)

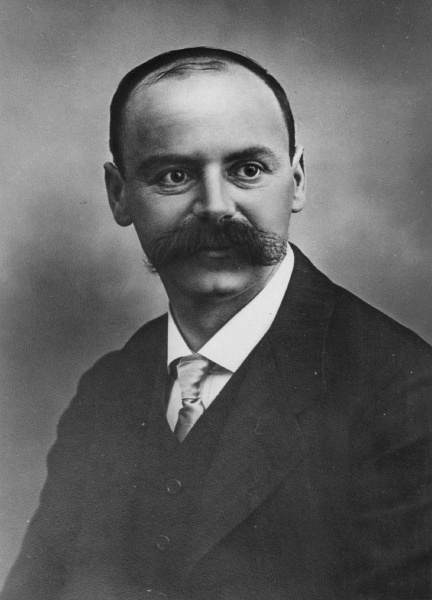
- Born: 9 October 1873; Frankfurt am Main, German Empire
- Died: 11 May 1916 (aged 42); Potsdam, German Empire
- Education: Ludwig-Maximilians-Universität München; University of Strasbourg
- Known for: Schwarzschild metric Schwarzschild coordinates Schwarzschild radius Schwarzschild law Interior Schwarzschild metric Schwarzschild's equation for radiative transfer Schwarzschild telescope Conic constant Lagrangian of electromagnetism
- Children: 3, including Agathe and Martin
- Scientific career
- Fields: Physics; Astronomy
- Doctoral advisor: Hugo von Seeliger

Karl Schwarzschild (German: [kaʁl ˈʃvaʁtsʃɪlt]; 9 October 1873 – 11 May 1916) was a German physicist and astronomer.

Schwarzschild provided the first exact solution to the Einstein field equations of general relativity, for the limited case of a single spherical non-rotating mass, which he accomplished in 1915, the same year that Einstein first introduced general relativity. The Schwarzschild solution, which makes use of Schwarzschild coordinates and the Schwarzschild metric, leads to a derivation of the Schwarzschild radius, which is the size of the event horizon of a non-rotating black hole.

Schwarzschild accomplished this while serving in the German army during World War I. He died the following year, possibly from the autoimmune disease pemphigus, which he developed while at the Russian front.

== Life ==
Karl Schwarzschild was born on 9 October 1873 in Frankfurt am Main, the eldest of six boys and one girl, to Jewish parents. His father was active in the business community of the city, and the family had ancestors in Frankfurt from the sixteenth century onwards. The family owned two fabric stores in Frankfurt. His brother Alfred became a painter. The young Schwarzschild attended a Jewish primary school until 11 years of age and then the Lessing-Gymnasium (secondary school). He received an all-encompassing education, including subjects like Latin, Ancient Greek, music and art, but developed a special interest in astronomy early on. He proved to be a child prodigy, having two papers on binary orbits (celestial mechanics) published before the age of sixteen.

After graduation in 1890, he attended the University of Strasbourg to study astronomy. After two years he transferred to the Ludwig-Maximilians-Universität München, where he obtained his doctorate in 1896 for a work on Henri Poincaré's theories.

From 1897, he worked as assistant at the Kuffner Observatory in Vienna. His work here concentrated on the photometry of star clusters and laid the foundations for a formula linking the intensity of the starlight, exposure time, and the resulting contrast on a photographic plate. An integral part of that theory is the Schwarzschild exponent (astrophotography). In 1899, he returned to Munich to complete his Habilitation.

From 1901 until 1909, he was a professor at the prestigious Göttingen Observatory within the University of Göttingen, where he had the opportunity to work with some significant figures, including David Hilbert and Hermann Minkowski. Schwarzschild became the director of the observatory. He married Else Rosenbach, a great-granddaughter of Friedrich Wöhler and daughter of a professor of surgery at Göttingen, in 1909. Later that year they moved to Potsdam, where he took up the post of director of the Astrophysical Observatory of Potsdam. This was then the most prestigious post available for an astronomer in Germany.

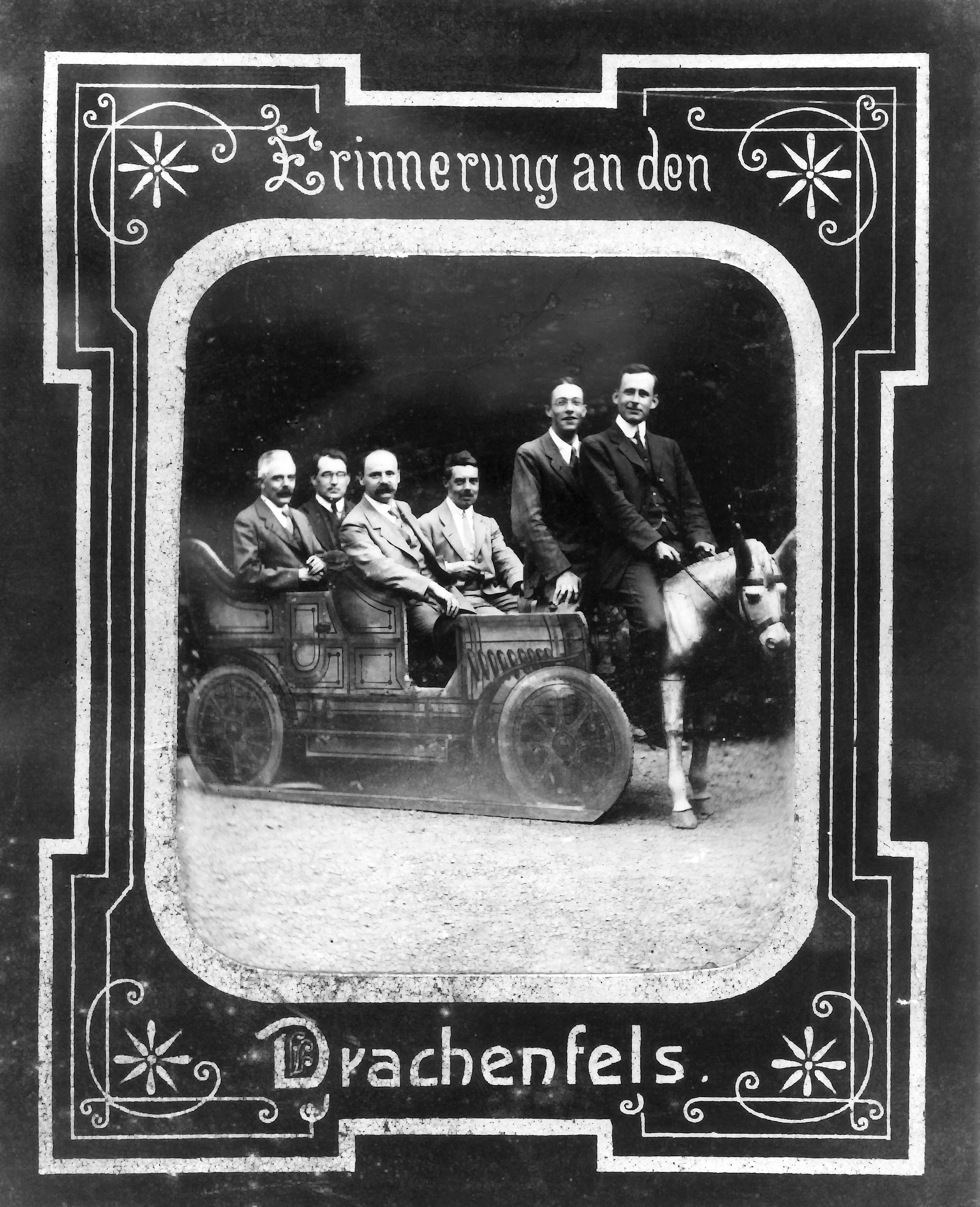
Schwarzschild, third from left in the automobile; possibly during the Fifth Conference of the International Union for Co-operation in Solar Research, held in Bonn, Germany

Schwarzschild at the Fourth Conference International Union for Cooperation in Solar Research at Mount Wilson Observatory, 1910

From 1912, Schwarzschild was a member of the Prussian Academy of Sciences.

=== Work on general relativity and death ===
At the outbreak of World War I in 1914, Schwarzschild volunteered for service in the German army despite being over 40 years old. He served on both the western and eastern fronts, specifically helping with ballistic calculations and rising to the rank of second lieutenant in the artillery. While serving on the front in Russia in 1915, he began to suffer from pemphigus, a rare and painful autoimmune skin-disease. In March 1916, Schwarzschild left military service because of his illness and returned to Göttingen.

Nevertheless, he managed to write three important papers, two on the theory of relativity and one on quantum theory. His papers on relativity produced the first exact solutions to the Einstein field equations, and a minor modification of these results gives the well-known solution that now bears his name — the Schwarzschild metric. He also identified the Schwarzschild radius, at which a star will form what is now known as a black hole, though he wrongly believed this finding to be a mathematical curiosity that had no practical relevance. Twenty-three years after Schwarzschild's death, J. Robert Oppenheimer and Hartland Snyder correctly predicted the existence of black holes in their Oppenheimer–Snyder model, though they did not draw directly on Schwarzschild's work.

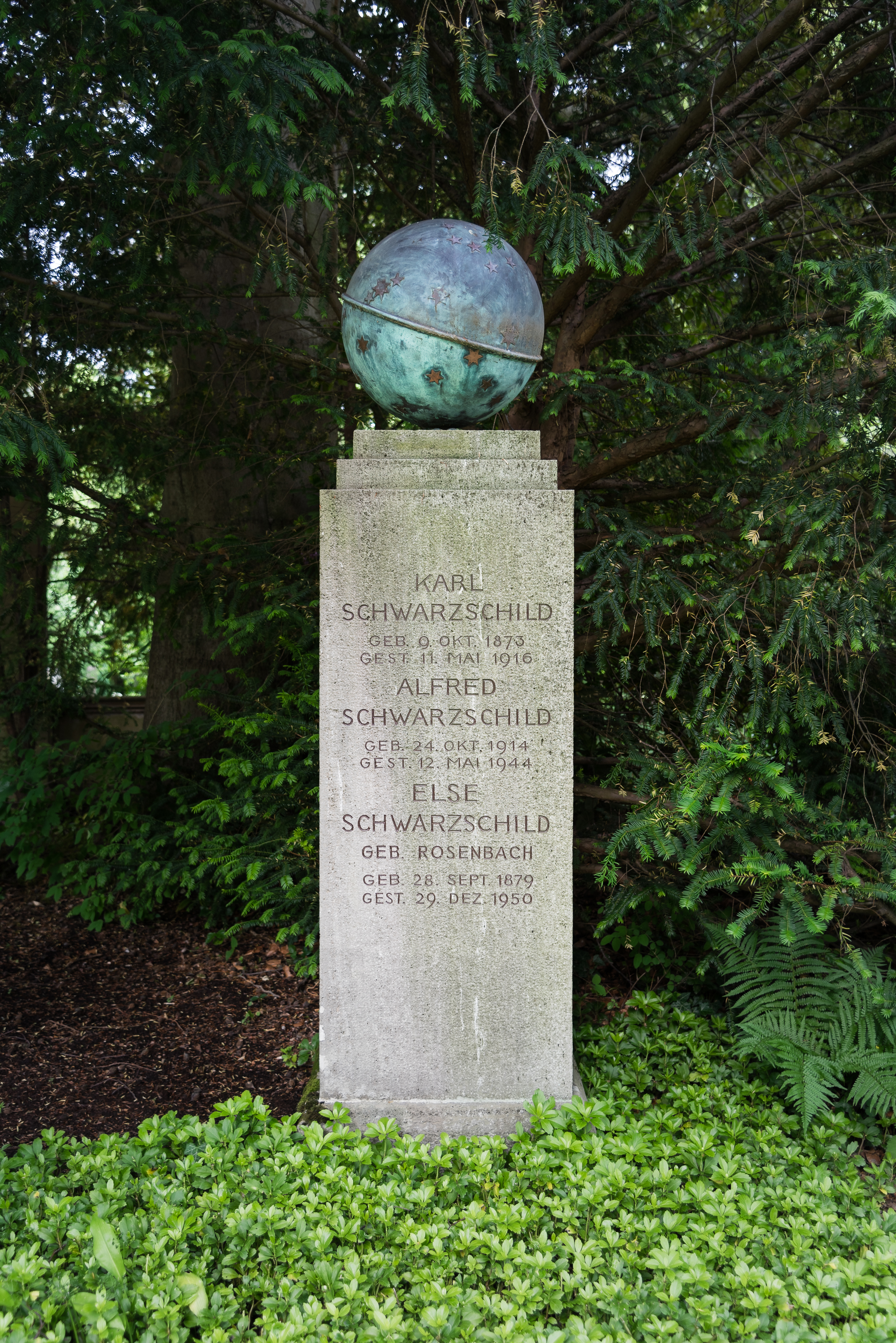
Karl Schwarzschild's grave at Stadtfriedhof (Göttingen)

Schwarzschild died of immune complications related to his illness on 11 May 1916, at the age of 42. He rests in his family grave at the Stadtfriedhof Göttingen.

With his wife Else he had three children:

1. Agathe Thornton (1910–2006) emigrated to Great Britain in 1933. In 1946, she moved to New Zealand, where she became a classics professor at the University of Otago in Dunedin.
2. Martin Schwarzschild (1912–1997) became a professor of astronomy at Princeton University, and was the first astronomer to lift a telescope into the stratosphere by balloon.
3. Alfred Schwarzschild (1914–1944) remained in Nazi Germany and was murdered during the Holocaust.

== Work ==
Schwarzschild's solutions to the Einstein field equations are fundamental to the study of gravitation, as fundamental as Coulomb's law is for electricity. In addition, his research interests were extremely broad, including work in celestial mechanics, observational stellar photometry, quantum mechanics, instrumental astronomy, stellar structure, radiative transfer, stellar statistics, Halley's Comet, and spectroscopy.

Some of his particular achievements include measurements of variable stars, using photography, and the improvement of optical systems, through the perturbative investigation of geometrical aberrations.

=== Physics of photography ===
While at Vienna in 1897, Schwarzschild developed a formula, now known as the Schwarzschild law, to calculate the optical density of photographic material. It involved an exponent now known as the Schwarzschild exponent, which is the $p$ in the formula:

$$i = f ( I \,t^p )$$

(where $i$ is optical density of exposed photographic emulsion, a function of $I$, the intensity of the source being observed, and $t$, the exposure time, with $p$ a constant). This formula was important for enabling more accurate photographic measurements of the intensities of faint astronomical sources.

=== Electrodynamics ===
According to Wolfgang Pauli, Schwarzschild is the first to introduce the correct Lagrangian formalism of the electromagnetic field as

$$S = \frac12 \int (H^2-E^2) \mathrm dV + \int \rho(\phi - \mathbf{A} \cdot \mathbf{u}) \mathrm dV$$

where $\mathbf{E},\mathbf{H}$ are the electric and applied magnetic fields, $\mathbf{A}$ is the vector potential and $\phi$ is the electric potential.

He also introduced a field free variational formulation of electrodynamics (also known as "action at distance" or "direct interparticle action") based only on the world line of particles as

$$S=\sum_{i}m_{i}\int_{C_{i}}\mathrm ds_{i}+\frac{1}{2}\sum_{i,j}\iint_{C_{i},C_{j}}q_{i}q_{j}\delta\left(\left\Vert P_{i}P_{j}\right\Vert \right)\mathrm d\mathbf{s}_{i}\mathrm d\mathbf{s}_{j}$$

where $C_\alpha$ are the world lines of the particle, $d\mathbf{s}_{\alpha}$ the (vectorial) arc element along the world line. Two points on two world lines contribute to the Lagrangian (are coupled) only if they are a zero Minkowskian distance (connected by a light ray), hence the term $\delta\left(\left\Vert P_{i}P_{j}\right\Vert \right)$. The idea was further developed by Hugo Tetrode and Adriaan Fokker in the 1920s and John Archibald Wheeler and Richard Feynman in the 1940s and constitutes an alternative but equivalent formulation of electrodynamics.

=== Thermal radiation ===
In 1906, Schwarzschild developed the concept of radiative equilibrium between convection inside the Sun and thermal radiation at the surface. He developed an equation for radiative transfer and proved that, in accordance to data, the Sun's photosphere is in radiative equilibrium.

=== Relativity ===
The Kepler problem in general relativity, using the Schwarzschild metric

Einstein himself was pleasantly surprised to learn that the field equations admitted exact solutions, because of their prima facie complexity, and because he himself had produced only an approximate solution. Einstein's approximate solution was given in his famous 1915 article on the advance of the perihelion of Mercury. There, Einstein used rectangular coordinates to approximate the gravitational field around a spherically symmetric, non-rotating, non-charged mass. Schwarzschild, in contrast, chose a more elegant "polar-like" coordinate system and was able to produce an exact solution which he first set down in a letter to Einstein of 22 December 1915, written while he was serving in the war stationed on the Russian front. He concluded the letter by writing: "As you see, the war is kindly disposed toward me, allowing me, despite fierce gunfire at a decidedly terrestrial distance, to take this walk into this your land of ideas." In 1916, Einstein wrote to Schwarzschild on this result:

I have read your paper with the utmost interest. I had not expected that one could formulate the exact solution of the problem in such a simple way. I liked very much your mathematical treatment of the subject. Next Thursday I shall present the work to the Academy with a few words of explanation.

— Albert Einstein,

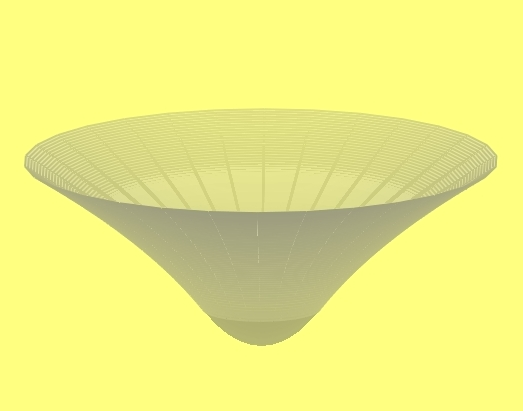
Boundary region of Schwarzschild interior and exterior solution

Schwarzschild's second paper, which gives what is now known as the "Inner Schwarzschild solution" (in German: "innere Schwarzschild-Lösung"), is valid within a sphere of homogeneous and isotropic distributed molecules within a shell of radius r=R. It is applicable to solids; incompressible fluids; the sun and stars viewed as a quasi-isotropic heated gas; and any homogeneous and isotropic distributed gas.

Schwarzschild's first (spherically symmetric) solution does not contain a coordinate singularity on a surface that is now named after him. In his coordinates, this singularity lies on the sphere of points at a particular radius, called the Schwarzschild radius:

$$R_{s} = \frac{2GM}{c^{2}}$$

where G is the gravitational constant, M is the mass of the central body, and c is the speed of light in vacuum. In cases where the radius of the central body is less than the Schwarzschild radius, $R_{s}$ represents the radius within which all massive bodies, and even photons, must inevitably fall into the central body (ignoring quantum tunnelling effects near the boundary). When the mass density of this central body exceeds a particular limit, it triggers a gravitational collapse which, if it occurs with spherical symmetry, produces what is known as a Schwarzschild black hole. This occurs, for example, when the mass of a neutron star exceeds the Tolman–Oppenheimer–Volkoff limit (about three solar masses).

The modern interpretation of the Schwarzschild solution as describing a black hole developed only gradually after Schwarzschild's death. In his original 1916 paper, Schwarzschild used a radial coordinate that differs from the standard Schwarzschild radial coordinate used in modern presentations, and he did not identify the surface now associated with the Schwarzschild radius as an event horizon. The apparent singularity at this radius subsequently became the subject of considerable debate among relativists, including Albert Einstein and David Hilbert. It was only later, through developments in the understanding of coordinate singularities and the extension of the Schwarzschild spacetime, that the surface was recognised as a horizon rather than a physical singularity. This historical development helped establish the Schwarzschild solution as the simplest exact model of a black hole in general relativity.

== Honours ==
Asteroid 837 Schwarzschilda is named in his honour, as is the large crater Schwarzschild, on the far side of the Moon.

== Cultural references ==
Schwarzschild appears as a character in the science fiction short story "Schwarzschild Radius" (1987) by Connie Willis. He also appears as a fictionalized character in the story “Schwarzschild’s Singularity” in the collection When We Cease to Understand the World (2020) by Benjamín Labatut.

== Works ==
The entire scientific estate of Karl Schwarzschild is stored in a special collection of the Lower Saxony National and University Library of Göttingen.

Relativity

- Über das Gravitationsfeld eines Massenpunktes nach der Einstein’schen Theorie. Reimer, Berlin 1916, S. 189 ff. (Sitzungsberichte der Königlich-Preussischen Akademie der Wissenschaften; 1916)
- Über das Gravitationsfeld einer Kugel aus inkompressibler Flüssigkeit. Reimer, Berlin 1916, S. 424-434 (Sitzungsberichte der Königlich-Preussischen Akademie der Wissenschaften; 1916)

Other papers

- Untersuchungen zur geometrischen Optik I. Einleitung in die Fehlertheorie optischer Instrumente auf Grund des Eikonalbegriffs, 1906, Abhandlungen der Gesellschaft der Wissenschaften in Göttingen, Band 4, Nummero 1, S. 1–31
- Untersuchungen zur geometrischen Optik II. Theorie der Spiegelteleskope, 1906, Abhandlungen der Gesellschaft der Wissenschaften in Göttingen, Band 4, Nummero 2, S. 1–28
- Untersuchungen zur geometrischen Optik III. Über die astrophotographischen Objektive, 1906, Abhandlungen der Gesellschaft der Wissenschaften in Göttingen, Band 4, Nummero 3, S. 1–54
- Über Differenzformeln zur Durchrechnung optischer Systeme, 1907, Nachrichten von der Gesellschaft der Wissenschaften zu Göttingen, S. 551–570
- Aktinometrie der Sterne der B. D. bis zur Größe 7.5 in der Zone 0° bis +20° Deklination. Teil A. Unter Mitwirkung von Br. Meyermann, A. Kohlschütter und O. Birck, 1910, Abhandlungen der Gesellschaft der Wissenschaften in Göttingen, Band 6, Numero 6, S. 1–117
- Über das Gleichgewicht der Sonnenatmosphäre, 1906, Nachrichten von der Gesellschaft der Wissenschaften zu Göttingen, S. 41–53
- Die Beugung und Polarisation des Lichts durch einen Spalt. I., 1902, Mathematische Annalen, Band 55, S. 177–247
- Zur Elektrodynamik. I. Zwei Formen des Princips der Action in der Elektronentheorie, 1903, Nachrichten von der Gesellschaft der Wissenschaften zu Göttingen, S. 126–131
- Zur Elektrodynamik. II. Die elementare elektrodynamische Kraft, 1903, Nachrichten von der Gesellschaft der Wissenschaften zu Göttingen, S. 132–141
- Zur Elektrodynamik. III. Ueber die Bewegung des Elektrons, 1903, Nachrichten von der Gesellschaft der Wissenschaften zu Göttingen, S. 245–278
- Ueber die Eigenbewegungen der Fixsterne, 1907, Nachrichten von der Gesellschaft der Wissenschaften zu Göttingen, S. 614–632
- Ueber die Bestimmung von Vertex und Apex nach der Ellipsoidhypothese aus einer geringeren Anzahl beobachteter Eigenbewegungen, 1908, Nachrichten von der Gesellschaft der Wissenschaften zu Göttingen, S. 191–200
- K. Schwarzschild, E. Kron: Ueber die Helligkeitsverteilung im Schweif des Halley´schen Kometen, 1911, Nachrichten von der Gesellschaft der Wissenschaften zu Göttingen, S. 197–208
- Die naturwissenschaftlichen Ergebnisse und Ziele der neueren Mechanik., 1904, Jahresbericht der Deutschen Mathematiker-Vereinigung, Band 13, S. 145–156
- Über die astronomische Ausbildung der Lehramtskandidaten., 1907, Jahresbericht der Deutschen Mathematiker-Vereinigung, Band 16, S. 519–522

== See also ==
- List of things named after Karl Schwarzschild
