= Martin Schwarzschild =

German-American astrophysicist

- Born: May 31, 1912; Potsdam, German Empire
- Died: April 10, 1997 (aged 84); Langhorne, Pennsylvania, United States
- Citizenship: German; American
- Education: University of Göttingen
- Known for: Schwarzschild criterion
- Father: Karl Schwarzchild
- Awards: Newcomb Cleveland Prize (1957); Karl Schwarzschild Medal (1959); Henry Draper Medal (1960); Bruce Medal (1965); Brouwer Award (1992); Balzan Prize (1994); National Medal of Science (1997); Foreign Member of the Royal Society
- Scientific career
- Fields: Physics; Astronomy
- Workplaces: Columbia University; Princeton University
- Doctoral students: Emilia Pisani Belserene

Martin Schwarzschild (May 31, 1912 – April 10, 1997) was a German-American astrophysicist.

== Biography ==
Schwarzschild was born in Potsdam into a distinguished German Jewish academic family. His father was the physicist Karl Schwarzschild and his uncle the astrophysicist Robert Emden. His sister, Agathe Thornton, became a classics scholar in New Zealand.

In line with a request in his father's will, his family moved to Göttingen in 1916. Schwarzschild studied at the University of Göttingen and took his doctoral examination in December 1936. He left Germany in 1936 for Norway and then the United States. Schwarzschild served in the US army intelligence. He was awarded the Legion of Merit and the Bronze Star for his wartime service. After returning to the US, he married fellow astronomer Barbara Cherry (1914–2008). In 1947, Martin Schwarzschild joined his lifelong friend, Lyman Spitzer at Princeton University. Spitzer died 10 days before Schwarzschild.

Schwarzschild's work in the fields of stellar structure and stellar evolution led to improved understanding of pulsating stars, differential solar rotation, post-main sequence evolutionary tracks on the Hertzsprung-Russell diagram (including how stars become red giants), hydrogen shell sources, the helium flash, and the ages of star clusters. Schwarzschild was also among the first to use digital computers in the study of astronomy. With Fred Hoyle, he computed some of the first stellar models to correctly ascend the red-giant branch by steadily burning hydrogen in a shell around the core. He and Härm were the first to compute stellar models going through thermal pulses on the asymptotic giant branch and later showed that these models develop convective zones between the helium- and hydrogen-burning shells, which can bring nuclear ashes to the visible surface. Schwarzschild's 1958 book Structure and Evolution of the Stars taught a generation of astrophysicists how to apply electronic computers to the computation of stellar models.

In the 1950s and ’60s, responding to a challenge by fellow professor James Van Allen, he headed the Stratoscope projects, launching telescopes into the stratosphere with high-altitude balloons. This allowed the photography of astronomical phenomena without atmospheric interference. The first Stratoscope produced high resolution images of solar granules and sunspots, confirming the existence of convection in the solar atmosphere, and the second obtained infrared spectra of planets, red giant stars, and the nuclei of galaxies. In his later years he made significant contributions toward understanding the dynamics of elliptical galaxies.

In the 1980s, Schwarzschild applied his numerical skills to building models for triaxial galaxies.

Schwarzschild was the Eugene Higgins Professor Emeritus of Astronomy at Princeton University, where he spent most of his professional life.

== Honors ==
=== Awards ===
- Karl Schwarzschild Medal (1959)
- Henry Norris Russell Lectureship (1960)
- Henry Draper Medal of the National Academy of Sciences (1960)
- Eddington Medal (1963)
- Bruce Medal (1965)
- Rittenhouse Medal (1966)
- Gold Medal of the Royal Astronomical Society (1969)
- Brouwer Award (1992)
- Balzan Prize (1994, with Fred Hoyle)
- National Medal of Science (1997)

=== Memberships ===
- American Academy of Arts and Sciences (1954)
- United States National Academy of Sciences (1956)
- American Philosophical Society (1981)

=== Named after him ===
- Asteroid 4463 Marschwarzschild

== See also ==
- Stratoscope
- Perhapsatron
- Betelgeuse
- Interchange instability
