= Gamow (crater) =

Crater on the Moon

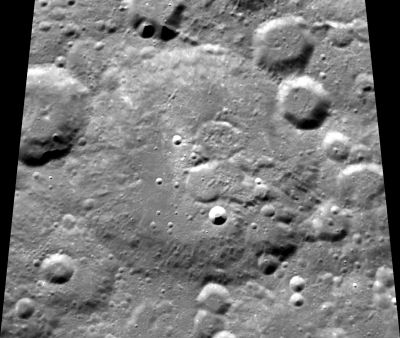
- Clementine mosaic
- Coordinates: 65.3°N 145.3°E
- Diameter: 113.92 km (70.79 mi)
- Depth: Unknown
- Colongitude: 215° at sunrise
- Formation: Pre-Nectarian
- Eponym: George Gamow

Gamow is a large lunar impact crater on the far side of the Moon. It is located in the northern hemisphere, to the southeast of Schwarzschild, a walled plain.

This crater is assigned to the Pre-Nectarian period on the lunar geologic timescale. It is a worn and eroded feature, with a rim that has been battered and overlain by multiple impacts. Satellite crater Gamow V is attached to the western exterior, and the joined crater pair Gamow A and Gamow B overlie the northeastern side. The eastern rim is the most damaged section, while the rim to the west is free from impacts. The western inner wall does display a fine radial groove texture, but is otherwise nearly featureless. Near the midpoint is a palimpsest, or ghost-crater feature consisting of just the rim projecting up through the otherwise relatively level surface.

This formation is named after the Russian-American physicist George Gamow (1904-1968). Its designation was formally adopted in 1970 by the International Astronomical Union.

== Satellite craters ==
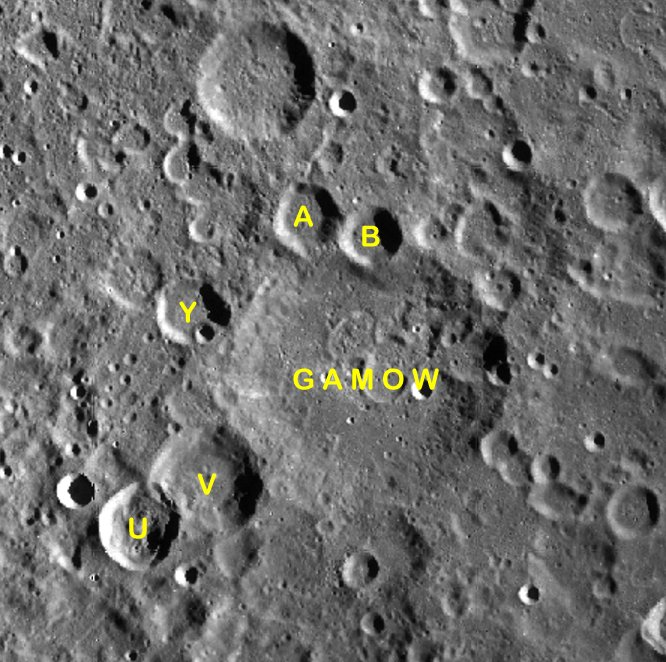
Satellite features and surroundings

By convention these features are identified on lunar maps by placing the etter on the side of the crater midpoint that is closest to Gamow.

Gamow	Latitude	Longitude	Diameter
A	67.3° N	148.8° E	31 km
B	66.4° N	149.5° E	26 km
U	66.7° N	137.0° E	39 km
V	66.3° N	139.7° E	49 km
Y	67.8° N	143.9° E	27 km
