= Agathe Thornton =

New Zealand scholar (1910–2006)

- Born: Agathe Schwarzschild; 20 November 1910; Germany
- Died: 21 October 2006 (aged 95); Dunedin, New Zealand
- Occupation: Academic
- Title: Professor, Professor Emeritus (from 1975)
- Spouse: Harry Thornton
- Parent(s): Karl Schwarzschild (father); Else Schwarzschild (mother)
- Relatives: Martin Schwarzschild (brother); Alfred Schwarzschild (brother)

Academic background
- Education: University of Göttingen; Newnham College, Cambridge

Academic work
- Discipline: Classics; Māori language
- Institutions: University of Otago
- Notable works: People and themes in Homer's Odyssey (1970)

Agathe Henriette Franziska Thornton (née Schwarzschild; 20 November 1910 – 21 October 2006) was a New Zealand academic specialising in classics and Māori studies. She was born in Germany and moved to New Zealand in 1947. She taught in the classics department of the University of Otago from 1948, eventually being appointed professor of classics, until her retirement in 1975.

== Early life ==
Thornton was born Agathe Schwarzschild on 20 November 1910. Her father was the physicist Karl Schwarzschild (1873-1916), her mother was Else Schwarzschild née Rosenbach; and she had two younger brothers, the German-American physicist Martin Schwarzschild (1912-1997), and Alfred Schwarzschild (1914-1944) who remained in Nazi Germany and was murdered during the Holocaust. While living in Germany she studied at the University of Göttingen.

In 1933 she moved to the United Kingdom, fleeing Nazi Germany because of Jewish heritage on her father's side. There she studied at Newnham College, Cambridge, supported by the astronomer Cecilia Payne-Gaposchkin, and with financial aid from an anonymous donor who was later identified as Sir Arthur Eddington. At the outbreak of World War II she avoided internment on the Isle of Man as an enemy alien thanks to support from W. H. M. Greaves, the Astronomer Royal for Scotland, who stood bail for her. In Scotland she met and married the Presbyterian minister Harry Thornton.

== Academic career ==
Thornton published her first academic article in 1945 while living in Newmachar, Aberdeenshire. In 1947 her family moved to New Zealand, and from 1948 onwards both Agathe and her husband Harry taught as lecturers at the University of Otago in Dunedin. Her appointment was the occasion for overturning a university prohibition on hiring married women with children. In 1970 she published her best-known book, People and Themes in Homer's Odyssey.

After retirement in 1975, she continued publishing in the field of classics, while also learning the Māori language for the purpose of scholarship. In 1986 she presented the Macmillan Brown Lectures at the University of Otago on the theme 'Maori oral literature as seen by a classicist'. These lectures were published the following year in a book of the same title.

Her subsequent research publications were in the field of Māori studies. These included new editions of Māori oral literature (Te Uamairangi's lament for his house, 1986; The story of Maui by Te Rangikaheke, 1992), studies of Māori cosmological myths (Ancient Maori cosmologies from the Wairarapa, 1998; The birth of the universe. Te whānautanga o te ao tukupū, 2004), and articles on linguistics and oral narrative techniques.

== Works ==
- 1945. 'The Hebrew conception of speech as a creative energy.' The Hibbert journal 44: 132–134.
- 1962 (with Harry Thornton and A. A. Lind). Time and style: a psycho-linguistic essay in classical literature. London: Methuen.
- 1962. 'A Catullan quotation in Virgil's Æneid book VI." Journal of the Australasian Universities Language and Literature Association (now Journal of language, literature and culture) 17: 77-79.
- 1963. 'Why do the suitors feast in the house of Odysseus?' Journal of the Australasian Universities Language and Literature Association (now Journal of language, literature and culture) 20: 341-345.
- 1965. 'Horace's ode to Calliope (III,4).' Journal of the Australasian Universities Language and Literature Association (now Journal of language, literature and culture) 23: 96-102.
- 1969. 'A Roman view of the universe in the first century BC.' Prudentia 1.1: 2-13.
- 1970. People and themes in Homer's Odyssey. Dunedin: University of Otago Press. ISBN 978-1-138-02137-2
- 1976. The living universe: gods and men in Virgil's Aeneid. Mnemosyne supplement 46. Leiden: Brill. ISBN 978-90-04-04579-8
- 1978. 'Once again, the duals in book 9 of the Iliad." Glotta 56.1/2: 1–4.
- 1984. Homer's Iliad: its composition and the motif of supplication. Hypomnemata 81. Göttingen: Vandenhoek & Ruprecht. ISBN 3-525-25179-3
- 1984. 'The story of the woman brought back from the underworld.' The journal of the Polynesian Society 93.3: 295–314.
- 1985. 'Two features of oral style in Maori narrative.' The journal of the Polynesian Society 94.2: 149–176.
- 1986 (editor). Te Uamairangi's lament for his house. Christchurch: University of Canterbury.
- 1986 (with Ray B. Harlow). A name & word index to Ngā Mōteatea. Dunedin: University of Otago Press.
- 1987. Maori oral literature as seen by a classicist. Dunedin: University of Otago Press. ISBN 978-0-908-56943-4
- 1988. 'A comparison of the time-notion and of appositional style in Homer and in ancient Maori.' Prudentia 20.2: 4–19.
- 1989. 'Some reflections on traditional Maori carving.' The journal of the Polynesian Society 98.2, 147–166.
- 1992 (editor). The story of Maui by Te Rangikaheke. Christchurch: University of Canterbury.
- 1998. Ancient Maori cosmologies from the Wairarapa. Dunedin: University of Otago Press. ISBN 978-1-877133-02-2
- 1998. 'Do a and o categories of "possession" in Maori express degrees of tapu?' The journal of the Polynesian Society 107.4: 381–383.
- 2004. The birth of the universe. Te whānautanga o te ao tukupū. Auckland: Reed Publishing. ISBN 978-0-7900-0948-3
