= Schwarzschild's equation for radiative transfer =

Formula for radiative heat transfer

In the study of heat transfer, Schwarzschild's equation is used to calculate radiative transfer (energy transfer via electromagnetic radiation) through a medium in local thermodynamic equilibrium that both absorbs and emits radiation.

The incremental change in spectral intensity, (dI_{λ}, [W/sr/m^{2}/μm]) at a given wavelength as radiation travels an incremental distance (ds) through a non-scattering medium is given by:

$$\begin{align}
dI_\lambda &= n\sigma_\lambda B_\lambda(T) \, ds - n\sigma_\lambda I_\lambda \, ds \\[1ex]
&= n \sigma_\lambda \left[B_\lambda(T) - I_\lambda\right] \, ds
\end{align}$$

where

- n is the number density of absorbing/emitting molecules (units: molecules/volume)
- σ_{λ} is their absorption cross-section at wavelength λ (units: area)
- B_{λ}(T) is the Planck function for temperature T and wavelength λ (units: power/area/solid angle/wavelength - e.g. watts/cm^{2}/sr/cm)
- I_{λ} is the spectral intensity of the radiation entering the increment ds with the same units as B_{λ}(T)

This equation and various equivalent expressions are known as Schwarzschild's equation. The second term describes absorption of radiation by the molecules in a short segment of the radiation's path (ds) and the first term describes emission by those same molecules. In a non-homogeneous medium, these parameters can vary with altitude and location along the path, formally making these terms n(s), σ_{λ}(s), T(s), and I_{λ}(s). Additional terms are added when scattering is important. Integrating the change in spectral intensity [W/sr/m^{2}/μm] over all relevant wavelengths gives the change in intensity [W/sr/m^{2}]. Integrating over a hemisphere then affords the flux perpendicular to a plane (F, [W/m^{2}]).

Schwarzschild's equation is the formula by which you may calculate the intensity of any flux of electromagnetic energy after passage through a non-scattering medium when all variables are fixed, provided we know the temperature, pressure, and composition of the medium.

== History ==
The Schwarzschild equation first appeared in Karl Schwarzschild's 1906 paper “Ueber das Gleichgewicht der Sonnenatmosphäre” (On the equilibrium of the solar atmosphere).

== Background ==
Radiative transfer refers to energy transfer through an atmosphere or other medium by means of electromagnetic waves or (equivalently) photons. The simplest form of radiative transfer involves a collinear beam of radiation traveling through a sample to a detector. That flux can be reduced by absorption, scattering or reflection, resulting in energy transmission over a path of less than 100%. The concept of radiative transfer extends beyond simple laboratory phenomena to include thermal emission of radiation by the medium - which can result in more photons arriving at the end of a path than entering it. It also deals with radiation arriving at a detector from a large source - such as the surface of the Earth or the sky. Since emission can occur in all directions, atmospheric radiative transfer (like Planck's Law) requires units involving a solid angle, such as W/sr/m^{2}.

At the most fundamental level, the absorption and emission of radiation are controlled by the Einstein coefficients for absorption, emission and stimulated emission of a photon (B_{12}, A_{21} and B_{21}) and the density of molecules in the ground and excited states (n_{1} and n_{2}). However, in the simplest physical situation – blackbody radiation – radiation and the medium through which it is passing are in thermodynamic equilibrium, and the rate of absorption and emission are equal. The spectral intensity [W/sr/m^{2}/μm] and intensity [W/sr/m^{2}] of blackbody radiation are given by the Planck function B_{λ}(T) and the Stefan–Boltzmann law. These expressions are independent of Einstein coefficients. Absorption and emission often reach equilibrium inside dense, non-transparent materials, so such materials often emit thermal infrared of nearly blackbody intensity. Some of that radiation is internally reflected or scattered at a surface, producing emissivity less than 1. The same phenomena makes the absorptivity of incoming radiation less than 1 and equal to emissivity (Kirchhoff's law).

When radiation has not passed far enough through a homogeneous medium for emission and absorption to reach thermodynamic equilibrium or when the medium changes with distance, Planck's Law and the Stefan-Boltzmann equation do not apply. This is often the case when dealing with atmospheres. If a medium is in Local Thermodynamic Equilibrium (LTE), then Schwarzschild's equation can be used to calculate how radiation changes as it travels through the medium. A medium is in LTE when the fraction of molecules in an excited state is determined by the Boltzmann distribution. LTE exists when collisional excitation and collisional relaxation of any excited state occur much faster than absorption and emission. (LTE does not require the rates of absorption and emission to be equal.) The vibrational and rotational excited states of greenhouse gases that emit thermal infrared radiation are in LTE up to about 60 km. Radiative transfer calculations show negligible change (0.2%) due to absorption and emission above about 50 km. Schwarzschild's equation therefore is appropriate for most problems involving thermal infrared in the Earth's atmosphere. The absorption cross-sections (σ_{λ}) used in Schwarzschild's equation arise from Einstein coefficients and processes that broaden absorption lines. In practice, these quantities have been measured in the laboratory; not derived from theory.

When radiation is scattered (the phenomena that makes the sky appear blue) or when the fraction of molecules in an excited state is not determined by the Boltzmann distribution (and LTE doesn't exist), more complicated equations are required. For example, scattering from clear skies reflects about 32 W/m^{2} (about 13%) of incoming solar radiation back to space. Visible light is also reflected and scattered by aerosol particles and water droplets (clouds). Neither of these phenomena have a significant impact on the flux of thermal infrared through clear skies.

Schwarzschild's equation can not be used without first specifying the temperature, pressure, and composition of the medium through which radiation is traveling. When these parameters are first measured with a radiosonde, the observed spectrum of the downward flux of thermal infrared (DLR) agrees closely with calculations and varies dramatically with location. Where dI is negative, absorption is greater than emission, and net effect is to locally warm the atmosphere. Where dI is positive, the net effect is "radiative cooling". By repeated approximation, Schwarzschild's equation can be used to calculate the equilibrium temperature change caused by an increase in GHGs, but only in the upper atmosphere where heat transport by convection is unimportant.

== Derivation ==
Schwarzschild's equation can be derived from Kirchhoff's law of thermal radiation, which states that absorptivity must equal emissivity at a given wavelength. (Like Schwarzschild's equation, Kirchhoff's law only applies to media in LTE.) Given a thin slab of atmosphere of incremental thickness ds, by definition its absorptivity is $\tfrac{dI_a}{I},$ where I is the incident radiation and dI_{a} is radiation absorbed by the slab. According to Beer's Law:

$$\frac{dI_a}{I} = n\sigma_\lambda \, ds$$

Also by definition, emissivity is equal to $\tfrac{dI_e}{B_\lambda(T)},$ where dI_{e} is the radiation emitted by the slab and B_{λ}(T) is the maximum radiation any object in LTE can emit. Setting absorptivity equal to emissivity affords:

$$\begin{align}
\frac{dI_e}{B_\lambda(T)} &= n\sigma_\lambda \, ds \\[4pt]
dI_e &= n\sigma_\lambda B_\lambda(T) \, ds
\end{align}$$

The total change in radiation, dI, passing through the slab is given by:

$$dI = dI_e - dI_a = n\sigma_\lambda B_\lambda(T) \, ds - n\sigma_\lambda I \, ds$$

Schwarzschild's equation has also been derived from Einstein coefficients by assuming a Maxwell–Boltzmann distribution of energy between a ground and excited state (LTE). The oscillator strength for any transition between ground and excited state depends on these coefficients. The absorption cross-section (σ_{λ}) is empirically determined from this oscillator strength and the broadening of the absorption/emission line by collisions, the Doppler effect and the uncertainty principle.

== Equivalent equations ==
Schwarzschild's equation has been expressed in different forms and symbols by different authors. The quantity nσ_{λ} is known as the absorption coefficient (β_{a}), a measure of attenuation with units of [cm^{−1}]. The absorption coefficient is fundamentally the product of a quantity of absorbers per unit volume, [cm^{−3}], times an efficiency of absorption (area/absorber, [cm^{2}]). Several sources replace nσ_{λ} with k_{λ}r, where k_{λ} is the absorption coefficient per unit density and r is the density of the gas. The absorption coefficient for spectral flux (a beam of radiation with a single wavelength, [W/m^{2}/μm]) differs from the absorption coefficient for spectral intensity [W/sr/m^{2}/μm] used in Schwarzschild's equation.

Integration of an absorption coefficient over a path from s_{1} and s_{2} affords the optical thickness (τ) of that path, a dimensionless quantity that is used in some variants of the Schwarzschild equation. When emission is ignored, the incoming radiation is reduced by a factor for 1/e when transmitted over a path with an optical thickness of 1.

$$\tau = \int_{s_1}^{s_2} n(s)\sigma_\lambda(s)\,ds$$

When expressed in terms of optical thickness, Schwarzschild's equation becomes:

$$dI _\lambda = [B _\lambda(T) - I_\lambda] \, d\tau$$

After integrating between a sensor located at τ = 0 and an arbitrary starting point in the medium, τ', the spectral intensity of the radiation reaching the sensor, I_{λ}(0), is:

$$I_\lambda(0) = I_\lambda(\tau')e^{-\tau'} + \int_0^{\tau'} B_\lambda(T)e^{-\tau}\,d\tau$$

where I(τ') is the spectral intensity of the radiation at the beginning of the path, $e^{-\tau'}$ is the transmittance along the path, and the final term is the sum of all of the emission along the path attenuated by absorption along the path yet to be traveled.

== Relationship to Planck's and Beer's laws ==
Both Beer's Law and Planck's Law can be derived from Schwarzschild's equation. In a sense, they are corollaries of Schwarzschild's equation.

When the spectral intensity of radiation is not changing as it passes through a medium, dI_{λ} = 0. In that situation, Schwarzschild's equation simplifies to Planck's law:

$$\begin{align}
0 &= n\sigma_\lambda[B _\lambda(T) - I_\lambda] \, ds \\[2pt]
I_\lambda &= B_\lambda(T)
\end{align}$$

When I_{λ} > B_{λ}(T), dI is negative and when I_{λ} < B_{λ}(T), dI is positive. As a consequence, the intensity of radiation traveling through any medium is always approaching the blackbody intensity given by Planck's law and the local temperature. The rate of approach depends on the density of absorbing/emitting molecules (n) and their absorption cross-section (σ_{λ}).

When the intensity of the incoming radiation, I_{λ}, is much greater than the intensity of blackbody radiation, B_{λ}(T), the emission term can be neglected. This is usually the case when working with a laboratory spectrophotometer, where the sample is near 300 K and the light source is a filament at several thousand K.

$$dI_\lambda = -n\sigma I_\lambda \, ds$$

If the medium is homogeneous, nσ_{λ} doesn't vary with location. Integration over a path of length s affords the form of Beer's Law used most often in the laboratory experiments:

$$I_\lambda = I_\lambda(0)e^{-n\sigma_\lambda s}$$

== Application to climate science ==
If no other fluxes change, the law of conservation of energy demands that the Earth warm (from one steady state to another) until balance is restored between inward and outward fluxes. Schwarzschild's equation alone says nothing about how much warming would be required to restore balance. When meteorologists and climate scientists refer to "radiative transfer calculations" or "radiative transfer equations" (RTE), the phenomena of emission and absorption are handled by numerical integration of Schwarzschild's equation over a path through the atmosphere. Weather forecasting models and climate models use versions of Schwarzschild's equation optimized to minimize computation time. Online programs are available that perform computations using Schwarzschild's equation.

Schwarzschild's equation is used to calculate the outward radiative flux from the Earth (measured in W/m^{2} perpendicular to the surface) at any altitude, especially the "top of the atmosphere" or TOA. This flux originates at the surface (I_{0}) for clear skies or cloud tops. dI increments are calculated for layers thin enough to be effectively homogeneous in composition and flux (I). These increments are numerically integrated from the surface to the TOA to give the flux of thermal infrared to space, commonly referred to as outgoing long-wavelength radiation (OLR). OLR is the only mechanism by which the Earth gets rid of the heat delivered continuously by the sun. The net downward radiative flux of thermal IR (DLR) produced by emission from GHGs in the atmosphere is obtained by integrating dI from the TOA (where I_{0} is zero) to the surface. DLR adds to the energy from the sun. Emission from each layer adds equally to the upward and downward fluxes. In contrast, different amounts of radiation are absorbed, because the upward flux entering any layer is usually greater than the downward flux.

In "line-by-line" methods, the change in spectral intensity (dI_{λ}, W/sr/m^{2}/μm) is numerically integrated using a wavelength increment small enough (less than 1 nm) to accurately describe the shape of each absorption line. The HITRAN database contains the parameters needed to describe 7.4 million absorption lines for 47 GHGs and 120 isotopologues. A variety of programs or radiative transfer codes can be used to process this data, including an online facility, SpectralCalc. To reduce the computational demand, weather forecast and climate models use broad-band methods that handle many lines as a single "band". MODTRAN is a broad-band method available online with a simple interface that anyone can use.

To convert intensity [W/sr/m^{2}] to flux [W/m^{2}], calculations usually invoke the "two-stream" and "plane parallel" approximations. The radiative flux is decomposed into three components, upward (+z), downward (-z), and parallel to the surface. This third component contributes nothing to heating or cooling the planet. $ds = dz/\cos\theta$, where $\theta$ is the zenith angle (away from vertical). Then the upward and downward intensities are integrated over a forward hemisphere, a process that can be simplified by using a "diffusivity factor" or "average effective zenith angle" of 53°. Alternatively, one can integrate over all possible paths from the entire surface to a sensor positioned a specified height above surface for OLR, or over all possible paths from the TOA to a sensor on the surface for DLR.

=== Greenhouse effect ===
Schwarzschild's equation provides a simple explanation for the existence of the greenhouse effect and demonstrates that it requires a non-zero lapse rate. Rising air in the atmosphere expands and cools as the pressure on it falls, producing a negative temperature gradient in the Earth's troposphere. When radiation travels upward through falling temperature, the incoming radiation, I, (emitted by the warmer surface or by GHGs at lower altitudes) is more intense than that emitted locally by B_{λ}(T). [B_{λ}(T) − I] is generally less than zero throughout the troposphere, and the intensity of outward radiation decreases as it travels upward. According to Schwarzschild's equation, the rate of fall in outward intensity is proportional to the density of GHGs (n) in the atmosphere and their absorption cross-sections (σ_{λ}). Any anthropogenic increase in GHGs will slow down the rate of radiative cooling to space, i.e. produce a radiative forcing until a saturation point is reached.

At steady state, incoming and outgoing radiation at the top of the atmosphere (TOA) must be equal. When the presence of GHGs in the atmosphere causes outward radiation to decrease with altitude, then the surface must be warmer than it would be without GHGs - assuming nothing else changed. Some scientists quantify the greenhouse effect as the 150 W/m^{2} difference between the average outward flux of thermal IR from the surface (390 W/m^{2}) and the average outward flux at the TOA.

If the Earth had an isothermal atmosphere, Schwarzschild's equation predicts that there would be no greenhouse effect or no enhancement of the greenhouse effect by rising GHGs. In fact, the troposphere over the Antarctic plateau is nearly isothermal. Both observations and calculations show a slight "negative greenhouse effect" – more radiation emitted from the TOA than the surface. Although records are limited, the central Antarctic Plateau has seen little or no warming.

=== Saturation ===
In the absence of thermal emission, wavelengths that are strongly absorbed by GHGs can be significantly attenuated within 10 m in the lower atmosphere. Those same wavelengths, however, are the ones where emission is also strongest. In an extreme case, roughly 90% of 667.5 cm^{−1} photons are absorbed within 1 meter by 400 ppm of CO_{2} at surface density, but they are replaced by emission of an equal number of 667.5 cm^{−1} photons. The radiation field thereby maintains the blackbody intensity appropriate for the local temperature. At equilibrium, I_{λ} = B_{λ}(T) and therefore dI_{λ} = 0 even when the density of the GHG (n) increases.

This has led some to falsely believe that Schwarzschild's equation predicts no radiative forcing at wavelengths where absorption is "saturated". However, such reasoning reflects what some refer to as the surface budget fallacy. This fallacy involves reaching erroneous conclusions by focusing on energy exchange near the planetary surface rather than at the top of the atmosphere (TOA). At wavelengths where absorption is saturated, increasing the concentration of a greenhouse gas does not change thermal radiation levels at low altitudes, but there are still important differences at high altitudes where the air is thinner.

As density decreases with altitude, even the strongest absorption bands eventually become semi-transparent. Once that happens, radiation can travel far enough that the local emission, B_{λ}(T), can differ from the absorption of incoming I_{λ}. The altitude where the transition to semi-transparency occurs is referred to as the "effective emission altitude" or "effective radiating level." Thermal radiation from this altitude is able to escape to space. Consequently, the temperature at this level sets the intensity of outgoing longwave radiation. This altitude varies depending on the particular wavelength involved.

Increasing concentration increases the "effective emission altitude" at which emitted thermal radiation is able to escape to space. The lapse rate (change in temperature with altitude) at the effective radiating level determines how a change in concentration will affect outgoing emissions to space. For most wavelengths, this level is in the troposphere, where temperatures decrease with increasing altitude. This means that increasing concentrations of greenhouse gas lead to decreasing emissions to space (a positive incremental greenhouse effect), creating an energy imbalance that makes the planet warmer than it would be otherwise. Thus, the presence or absence of absorption saturation at low altitudes does not necessarily indicate that absence of radiative forcing in response to increased concentrations.

The radiative forcing from doubling carbon dioxide occurs mostly on the flanks of the strongest absorption band.

Temperature rises with altitude in the lower stratosphere, and increasing CO_{2} there increases radiative cooling to space and is predicted by some to cause cooling above 14–20 km.
