= Schwarzschild (crater) =

Crater on the Moon

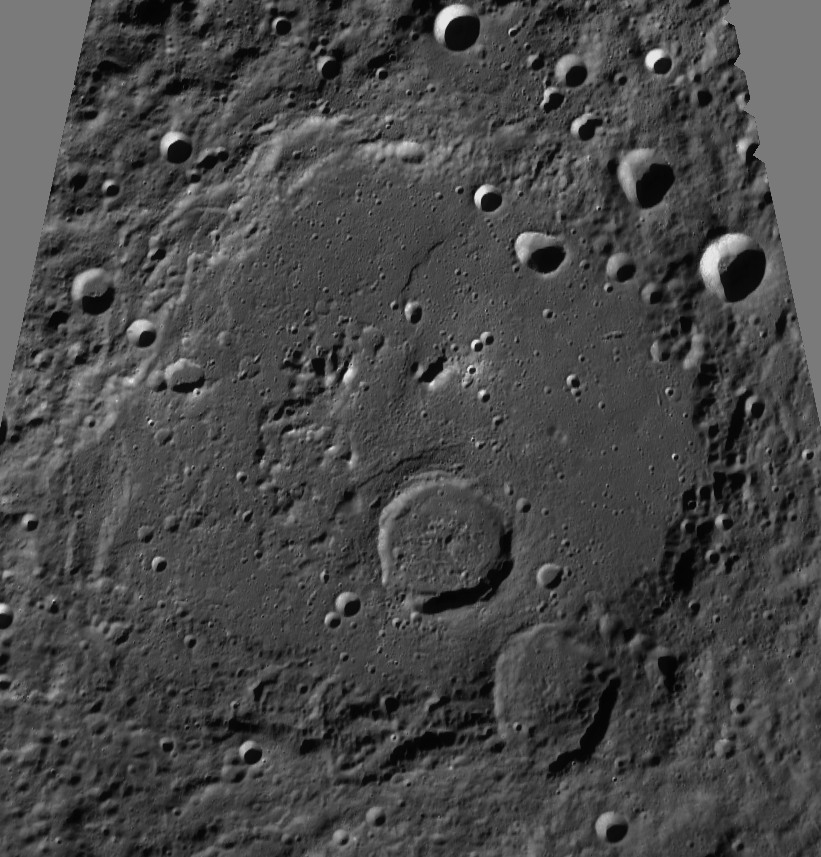
- LRO mosaic
- Coordinates: 70.1°N 121.2°E
- Diameter: 211.42 km
- Depth: Unknown
- Colongitude: 249° at sunrise
- Formation: Nectarian
- Eponym: Karl Schwarzschild

Schwarzschild is a large lunar impact crater, approximately 211 kilometers (131 mi) in diameter. It is located in the northern part of the Moon's far side. This class of formation is known as a peak ring basin, which has a single interior topographic ring or a discontinuous ring of peaks with no central peak. The nearest craters of note are Seares to the northeast, and Gamow to the southeast. It was named after German physicist and astronomer Karl Schwarzschild (1873–1916).

== Observations ==
This formation dates to the Nectarian period of the lunar geologic timescale. The somewhat irregular outer rim of Schwarzschild has been overlain by many smaller impact craters, including most notably Schwarzschild K across the southeastern face and Schwarzschild D on the northeastern rim. The rim is roughly circular in form, with an outward bulge along the southwestern side. The rim has been softened and modified by impact erosion, particularly to the northeast. Just to the northeast of Schwarzschild K is a short chain of small craters lying across the rim and inner wall of Schwarzschild.

The inner floor of Schwarzschild is relatively level by comparison with the rugged terrain outside, and is particularly flat in the north-northeastern half. There is a region of low, irregular ridges to the west of the midpoint. This peak ring bears the infrared spectrum of pure crystalline plagioclase. Lying in the southeastern part of the floor is the satellite crater Schwarzschild L, and surrounding this interior crater is an outer rampart formed from the ejecta material during its formation.

== Satellite craters ==
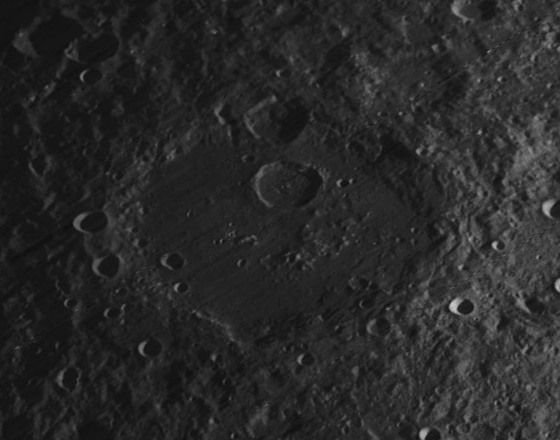
Oblique Lunar Orbiter 4 image

By convention these features are identified on lunar maps by placing the letter on the side of the crater midpoint that is closest to Schwarzschild.

| Schwarzschild | Latitude | Longitude | Diameter | Ref |
|---|---|---|---|---|
| A | 78.7° N | 124.0° E | 44.65 km | WGPSN |
| D | 71.9° N | 132.4° E | 21.89 km | WGPSN |
| K | 67.5° N | 125.0° E | 40.97 km | WGPSN |
| L | 69.3° N | 122.1° E | 45.38 km | WGPSN |
| Q | 66.3° N | 108.9° E | 17.52 km | WGPSN |
| S | 67.8° N | 104.7° E | 16.78 km | WGPSN |
| T | 69.9° N | 107.7° E | 15.61 km | WGPSN |

== See also ==
- Asteroid 837 Schwarzschilda
