= Schwarzschild telescope =

Type of reflecting telescope

The Schwarzschild telescope is a reflecting telescope with two aspherical concave mirrors. It was developed by Karl Schwarzschild and named after him.

== Construction ==
Schematic representation of the "Schwarzschild telescope"

Due to its structure, it is free from the aberrations of coma and spherical aberration and has no field curvature. The focus is inside the telescope, so it is only suitable for photographic purposes unless a diagonal mirror is included. A telescope of this type with a 60 cm primary mirror was built by Indiana University in the 1930s.

== Couder telescope ==
A variant of this is the Couder telescope, which eliminates the astigmatism image error, but has a field curvature.
