= 837 Schwarzschilda =

Main-belt asteroid

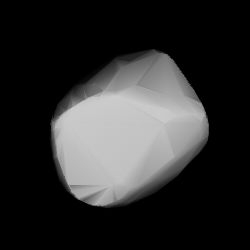
- Lightcurve-modelled shape of Schwarzschilda

Discovery
- Discovered by: M. F. Wolf
- Discovery site: Heidelberg Obs.
- Discovery date: 23 September 1916

Designations
- Named after: Karl Schwarzschild
- Alternative designations: 1916 AG · 1951 TB; 1965 VJ
- Minor planet category: main-belt

Orbital characteristics
- Epoch 31 July 2016 (JD 2457600.5)
- Uncertainty parameter 0
- Observation arc: 92.59 yr (33820 d)
- Aphelion: 2.3926 AU (357.93 Gm)
- Perihelion: 2.2035 AU (329.64 Gm)
- Semi-major axis: 2.2981 AU (343.79 Gm)
- Eccentricity: 0.041137
- Orbital period (sidereal): 3.48 yr (1272.4 d)
- Mean anomaly: 221.45°
- Mean motion: 0° 16^{m} 58.512^{s} / day
- Inclination: 6.7371°
- Longitude of ascending node: 200.05°
- Argument of perihelion: 173.33°
- Earth MOID: 1.20264 AU (179.912 Gm)
- Jupiter MOID: 2.75445 AU (412.060 Gm)
- T_{Jupiter}: 3.583

Physical characteristics
- Synodic rotation period: 24 h (1.0 d)
- Absolute magnitude (H): 12.3

837 Schwarzschilda, provisional designation 1916 AG, is a low-eccentric, well-observed asteroid from the asteroid belt, orbiting the Sun with a period of 3.48 years at a distance of 2.21–2.39 AU. It was discovered by German astronomer Max Wolf at Heidelberg Observatory on 23 September 1916.

The main-belt asteroid was named after physicist and astronomer Karl Schwarzschild (1873–1916), who had died earlier that year. He was director of the observatories in Göttingen and Potsdam, known for his work in photometry, geometrical optics, stellar statistics and theoretical astrophysics, most notably for producing the first exact solutions to Einstein's field equations. At the time, it was custom to give feminized names to minor planets.

== See also ==
- Meanings of minor planet names: 501–1000
- Schwarzschild radius
